Iron Maiden are an English heavy metal band formed in Leyton, East London, in 1975 by bassist and primary songwriter Steve Harris. Although fluid in the early years of the band, the lineup for most of the band's history has consisted of Harris, lead vocalist Bruce Dickinson, drummer Nicko McBrain, and guitarists Dave Murray, Adrian Smith and Janick Gers. The band have released 41 albums, including 17 studio albums, 13 live albums, four EPs and seven compilations. They have also released 47 singles and 20 video albums. Two electronic games have been released with Iron Maiden soundtracks, and the band's music is featured in a number of other video games.

As pioneers of the new wave of British heavy metal movement, Iron Maiden achieved initial success during the early 1980s. After several lineup changes, the band went on to release a series of UK and US Platinum and Gold albums, including 1980's eponymous debut album, 1981's Killers, 1982's The Number of the Beast, 1983's Piece of Mind, 1984's Powerslave, 1985's live release Live After Death, 1986's Somewhere in Time, 1988's Seventh Son of a Seventh Son, 1990's No Prayer for the Dying and 1992's Fear of the Dark. In 1982, the band released The Number of the Beast – its first album with Bruce Dickinson, who replaced Paul Di'Anno as lead singer – which was a turning point in their career, helping establish them as one of heavy metal's most important artists. The Number of the Beast is among the most popular heavy metal albums of all time, having sold almost 20 million copies worldwide.

Since the return of lead vocalist Bruce Dickinson and guitarist Adrian Smith in 1999, the band has undergone a resurgence in popularity, with a series of new albums and highly successful tours. Released in 2006, A Matter of Life and Death, their 14th studio album, reached top sales in dozens of countries, initiating the series of Iron Maiden's highest-ranked albums. Their 2010 album, The Final Frontier, peaked at No. 1 in 28 countries and received widespread critical acclaim. Their 16th studio album, The Book of Souls, was released on 4 September 2015 to similar success, debuting at No. 1 in the album charts of 24 countries with physical sales and summary in 43 territories with physical and digital sales. Most recently, their 17th studio album, Senjutsu, was released on 3 September 2021 and eventually reached No. 1 in 27 countries.

Iron Maiden have sold over 130 million copies of their albums worldwide, despite minimal radio and mainstream media support. The band's catalogue has sold over 200 million copies worldwide, including albums, singles, compilations and videos. By 2022, their releases have been certified Silver, Gold and Platinum around 600 times worldwide. Iron Maiden have become one of the most influential and revered rock bands of all time, and is credited with influencing countless bands and genres. The band's been constantly considered as one of the greatest metal bands in the history of popular music. Critics have stated that the musicians elevated heavy metal to an art form, proving that academic and musical inspirations can coexist. Iron Maiden are also ranked as one of the greatest live acts of all time.

The band and its members have received multiple industry awards, including the Grammy Awards and its equivalents in other countries. Other accolades the band has received include Brit Awards, Silver Clef Award, Nordoff-Robbins Award, Ivor Novello Awards, Juno Awards, Guinness Book of World Records, Public Choice International, Classic Rock Roll of Honour Awards, ECHO Awards, Top.HR Music Awards, Žebřík Music Awards, honorary doctorates, State Prizes, sales recognition, marketing achievements recognition awards, charity, film and sport awards among many others. Iron Maiden were inducted into the Hollywood RockWalk, BPI Hall of Fame and Kerrang! Hall of Fame. The band is also a part of permanent exhibitions of the Rock and Roll Hall of Fame, British Music Experience, Rock in Rio Wall of Fame and Wacken Open Air Hall of Fame. In 2023 Iron Maiden were honoured by Royal Mail UK with dedicated postal stamps and cards. The band as 'bona fide' rock legends belongs to an elitarian circle of British iconic bands honoured with a unique range of stamps, including the Rolling Stones, the Beatles, Pink Floyd, Queen and Iron Maiden as the fifth one.

Iron Maiden's lyrics cover such topics as history, literature, war, mythology, society and religion. Many of their songs are based on history, classic literature and film. , the band have played some 2,500 live shows, performing for tens of millions of fans. For over 40 years, the musicians have been supported by their famous mascot, "Eddie", who has appeared on almost all of their album and single covers, videos and merchandise. Originally designed by Derek Riggs, Eddie became the main attraction of Iron Maiden live shows, which feature theatrical elements like coloured backdrops, inflatables, pyrotechnics, elaborate lighting rigs, props and stage sets.

History

Early years (1975–1978)

Iron Maiden were formed on Christmas Day, 25 December 1975, by bassist Steve Harris shortly after he left his previous group, Smiler. Harris attributed the band's name to a film adaptation of The Man in the Iron Mask from the novel by Alexandre Dumas, the title of which reminded him of the iron maiden torture device. They originally had the name Ash Mountain, but most of the band members preferred the name Iron Maiden anyway, so that name was chosen shortly after the band formed. After months of rehearsal, Iron Maiden made their debut at St. Nicks Hall in Poplar on 1 May 1976, before taking up a semi-residency at the Cart and Horses Pub in Maryland, Stratford. A few decades later, the pub was officially named "The Birthplace of Iron Maiden" and turned into a music pub with many mementos of the band's early years as part of London's rock music history.

The original lineup was short-lived, with vocalist Paul Day being the first casualty as, according to Harris, he lacked "energy or charisma on stage". He was replaced by Dennis Wilcock, a Kiss fan who used makeup and fake blood during live performances. Wilcock's friend, guitarist Dave Murray, was invited to join, much to the dismay of the band's guitarists Dave Sullivan and Terry Rance. Their frustration led Harris to temporarily disband Iron Maiden in 1976, though the group reformed soon after with Murray as the sole guitarist. Harris and Murray remain the band's longest-standing members and have performed on all of their releases.

Iron Maiden recruited yet another guitarist in 1977, Bob Sawyer, who was sacked for embarrassing the band on stage by pretending to play guitar with his teeth. Tension ensued again, causing a rift between Murray and Wilcock, who convinced Harris to fire Murray, as well as original drummer Ron Matthews. A new lineup was put together, including future Cutting Crew member Tony Moore on keyboards, Terry Wapram on guitar and drummer Barry Purkis (better known today as Thunderstick). After a single gig with the band in January 1978, Moore was asked to leave as Harris decided that keyboards did not suit the band's sound. Dave Murray rejoined in late March 1978, which Terry Wapram disapproved of, so he was sacked. A few weeks later, Dennis Wilcock decided to leave Iron Maiden to form his own band, V1, with Wapram, and drummer Barry Purkis left, as well. Doug Sampson was at Dennis and Thunderstick's last gig and so joined the band afterwards.

Harris, Murray and Sampson spent the summer and autumn of 1978 rehearsing while they searched for a singer to complete the band's new lineup. A chance meeting at the Red Lion, a pub in Leytonstone, in November 1978 evolved into a successful audition for vocalist Paul Di'Anno. Steve Harris stated, "There's sort of a quality in Paul's voice, a raspiness in his voice, or whatever you want to call it, that just gave it this great edge". At this time, Murray would typically act as their sole guitarist, with Harris commenting, "Davey was so good he could do a lot of it on his own. The plan was always to get a second guitarist in, but finding one that could match Davey was really difficult".

Record contract and early releases (1978–1981)

On New Year's Eve 1978, Iron Maiden recorded a demo, consisting of four songs, at Spaceward Studios in Cambridge. Hoping that the recording would help them secure more gigs, the band presented a copy to Neal Kay, who, at the time, was managing a heavy metal club called "Bandwagon Heavy Metal Soundhouse", located in Kingsbury Circle, northwest London. Upon hearing the tape, Kay began playing the demo regularly at the Bandwagon, and one of the songs, "Prowler", eventually went to No. 1 in the Soundhouse charts, which were published weekly in Sounds magazine. A copy was also acquired by Rod Smallwood, who soon became the band's manager, and, as Iron Maiden's popularity increased, they released the demo on their own record label as The Soundhouse Tapes, named after the club. Featuring only three tracks (one song, "Strange World", was excluded as the band were unsatisfied with its production), all 5,000 copies sold out within weeks.

In December 1979, the band secured a major record deal with EMI and asked Dave Murray's childhood friend, Adrian Smith of Urchin, to join the group as their second guitarist. Due to his commitment to Urchin, Smith declined and Dennis Stratton was hired instead. Shortly afterwards, Doug Sampson left due to health issues and was replaced by ex-Samson drummer Clive Burr at Stratton's suggestion on 26 December 1979. Iron Maiden's first appearance on an album was on the Metal for Muthas compilation (released on 15 February 1980) with two early versions of "Sanctuary" and "Wrathchild". The release led to an ensuing tour that featured several other bands linked with the new wave of British heavy metal (NWoBHM) movement. According to different sources, between May 1976 and December 1979, the band played about 200 shows in Great Britain.

Iron Maiden released their self-titled album in 1980, which debuted at No. 4 in the UK Albums Chart. The album includes other early favourites such as "Running Free", "Transylvania", "Phantom of the Opera" and "Sanctuary" – which was not on the original UK release, but appeared on the US version and subsequent remasters. The band embarked on a headline tour of the UK, before opening for Kiss on their 1980 Unmasked Tour's European leg as well as supporting Judas Priest on select dates. Iron Maiden also appeared, to much acclaim, at the Reading Festival 1980 with almost 40,000 in attendance. They were second to top of the bill on the Saturday, with UFO headlining. After the Kiss tour, Dennis Stratton was dismissed from the band as a result of creative and personal differences, and was replaced by Smith in October 1980. In Europe, Iron Maiden played 28 shows to about 400,000 people (mainly Kiss fans). In December, the band played at the Rainbow Theatre in London, where their very first live video was filmed. Live at the Rainbow was released in May 1981, and the cuts "Iron Maiden" and "Wrathchild" from this video received heavy rotation on MTV during its first hours on the air as the first metal videos ever.

Their eponymous debut album achieved critical acclaim in Japan, where Iron Maiden were named "The Best Newcoming Foreign Band" by readers of Music Life magazine and received their very first Gold certification. Four decades later, Iron Maiden's debut album was ranked No. 13 of "The Greatest Hard Rock & Metal Albums Ever" published by journalists of opinion-forming Rolling Stone magazine and also named the third-most important metal debut album of all time. Iron Maiden is ranked at the similar positions in many other polls worldwide.

In 1981, Iron Maiden released their second studio album, Killers. Containing many tracks written prior to their debut release, it had only two new songs written for the record: "Prodigal Son" and "Murders in the Rue Morgue" (the latter's title was taken from the short story by Edgar Allan Poe). The leitmotif of the lyrics was a murder contemplated from different perspectives. Unsatisfied with the production on their debut album, the band hired veteran producer Martin Birch, who would continue to work with Iron Maiden until his retirement in 1992. The record was followed by the band's first world tour, which included their debut performance in the United States, opening for Judas Priest at The Aladdin Casino in Las Vegas. Iron Maiden played 45 shows in North America to several hundreds of thousands of fans, including two headline gigs in Canada. Killers made the band's USA album charts debut, reaching No. 78 on the Billboard 200, and they booked 132 shows to promote the album. The musicians played the small or mid-size venues using standard type of stage equipment including 200 lamps, smoke machines, two backdrops with Eddie and four members of the crew wearing Eddie masks when the song "Iron Maiden" was played live.

The band's second album featured the single "Twilight Zone/Wrathchild" (released as a double A-side) and speed metal opus "Purgatory", as well as two instrumental songs – "The Ides of March" and "Genghis Khan" – and the proto-thrash title track. The music style of the album inspired generations of thrash, speed and power metal bands. The cover illustration by Derek Riggs became the first of many more iconic covers in the history of the genre. Killers sold much better worldwide than the debut album, hitting the one million mark a year after launch, earning the group Gold certificates in Germany, Japan, Canada, Belgium, Denmark, France (double Gold) and in the United Kingdom. The album debuted at No. 12 in the UK and reached the Top 10 and Top 20 in many countries around the world.

The UK tour included the band's headline performance at the Hammersmith Odeon. However, Paul Di'Anno's addiction problems led to the cancellation of several German dates. In some of those cities, local fans reacted with street riots. Iron Maiden then toured Japan for the first time in seven shows. All tickets were sold out in record time, but further problems with Di'Anno forced the band to cancel two shows. The concert recordings from Nagoya were used on the mini-album Maiden Japan (Heavy Metal Army in Japan), which was released in September 1981. The band visited Yugoslavia as a headliner of the Belgrade festival with 50,000 people in attendance. It was the first time the band had played behind the Iron Curtain and also a groundbreaking performance for a new generation of heavy metal artists in the so-called Eastern Bloc. During the summer, Iron Maiden played several festivals in Europe, including appearances as "very special guests" at the Golden Summernights 1981 festival series held at Zeppelinfeld in Nuremberg with 100,000 people, but also in Stuttgart and Darmstadt in front of an audience of tens of thousands.

Success (1981–1985)

By 1981, Paul Di'Anno was demonstrating increasingly self-destructive behaviour, particularly due to his drug usage, about which Di'Anno comments, "It wasn't just that I was snorting a bit of coke, though; I was just going for it non-stop, 24 hours a day, every day ... the band had commitments piling up that went on for months, years, and I just couldn't see my way to the end of it. I knew I'd never last the whole tour. It was too much". With his performances waning, Di'Anno was immediately dismissed following the Killer World Tour, at which point the band had already selected his replacement.

After a meeting with Rod Smallwood at the Reading Festival, Bruce Dickinson, previously of Samson, auditioned for Iron Maiden in September 1981 and was immediately hired. The following month, Dickinson went out on the road with the band on a small headlining tour in Italy, as well as a one-off show at the Rainbow Theatre in the UK. For the last show, and in anticipation of their forthcoming album, the band played "Children of the Damned" and "22 Acacia Avenue", introducing fans to the sound towards which they were progressing.

In 1982, Iron Maiden released their third studio album, The Number of the Beast, which became the band's first No. 1 record on the UK Albums Chart, was a Top 10 hit in many other countries and reached No. 33 on the Billboard 200. At the time, Dickinson was in the midst of legal difficulties with Samson's management and was not permitted to add his name to any of the songwriting credits, although he still made what he described as a "moral contribution" to "Children of the Damned", "The Prisoner" and "Run to the Hills". For the second time, the band embarked on a world tour, dubbed The Beast on the Road, during which they visited North America, Japan, Australia and Europe, including a headline appearance for 40,000 people at the Reading Festival. Iron Maiden played 188 shows in 10 months. For the very first time, they presented a conceptual setting, including specially designed stage and lighting with almost 400 lamps. Also for the first time in the history of the band, a movable,  Eddie was presented on stage during the performance of the song "Iron Maiden".

The Beast on the Road's US leg proved controversial when an American conservative political lobbying group claimed that Iron Maiden were Satanic because of the new album's title track and "demonic" cover art, to the point where a group of Christian activists destroyed Iron Maiden records in protest. In recent years, Dickinson stated that the band treated this as "silliness" and that the demonstrations in fact gave them "loads of publicity". An American professor, Bryan A. Bardine, referring to the visual aspect of the band's third album, stated the authors' message seems to be understandable: "This album evokes power, passion and music that present darker themes and images".

The band played over 100 dates in North America, supporting Scorpions, Judas Priest and Rainbow. Iron Maiden headlined some Canadian dates, New York, Chicago free show and solo stops. They also performed at the biggest American festivals – Day on the Green, SuperFest, Pacific Jam, Rock Fest – which were held at big stadiums such as Rich Stadium, Anaheim Stadium, Oakland Alameda Coliseum or Comiskey Park, among many others. Iron Maiden were quickly promoted to the hard rock extra-league and avant-garde of heavy metal. The Number of the Beast is considered to be the groundbreaking album for modern heavy metal and has been back on the album sales charts and the all-time heavy metal albums polls constantly. The album's crowning track, titled "Hallowed Be Thy Name", is considered one of the few most important in the history of the genre. It has repeatedly held leading positions in various polls. After the first year of its release, 2.5 million copies were sold. A new and hugely successful chapter in Iron Maiden's future was cemented: by 2010, the album had sold over 14 million copies worldwide. The "Golden Era" in the band's history had begun. Today, The Number of the Beast is considered one of the major albums of all time (Top 3, Top 5) in heavy music, and by December 2021 it had sold almost 20 million copies worldwide. In December 1982, drummer Clive Burr was fired from the band and replaced by Nicko McBrain, who previously played for Trust. Although Harris stated that his dismissal took place because his live performances were affected by offstage activities, Burr objected to this and claimed that he was unfairly ousted from the band.

Soon afterwards, the band journeyed for the first time to the Bahamas to record the first of three consecutive albums at Compass Point Studios. In 1983, they released their fourth studio album, Piece of Mind, which reached the No. 3 spot in the UK and No. 14 on the Billboard 200. Piece of Mind features the successful singles "The Trooper" and "Flight of Icarus", the latter being notable as one of the band's few songs to gain substantial airplay in the US. Other notable songs of the album are "Where Eagles Dare" (named after the Clint Eastwood movie), "Revelations", "Die with Your Boots On" and the epic "To Tame a Land", which is based on Frank Herbert's Dune. Iron Maiden played 151 concerts in Europe and North America as a part of the World Piece Tour. For the very the first time, they booked a massive North America tour as headliners. Nearly 90 shows took place in 10,000+ capacity arenas, and the band sold out Madison Square Garden with a crowd of 20,000. In London, they played four consecutive nights at the Hammersmith Odeon, then toured many large venues across western Europe, including an extensive German leg. The World Piece Tour was concluded by two headlining performances at the Rock & Pop Festival at the Westfalenhalle in Dortmund. The show was broadcast live to 300 million people with the exception of the song "Iron Maiden" due to the band's "violent behaviour on stage".

The setting of the tour was the next step in the visual development of the band's concerts. Iron Maiden used, inter alia, a 100,000-watt sound system, a first for any group, designed specially for large sports arenas. The lighting equipment, in addition to the standard ramps with spots, included four movable, triangular ramps, rising to different heights above the stage and illuminating the audience from different angles. These were the first ramps of this type in the world, and their construction became a significant step forward as a starting point for the creation of mobile, extensive lighting systems used on subsequent tours. The lighting platform was based on over 520 lamps. As with the previous tour, the band had a conceptual set design with a number of props referring to the image of the promoted album, the movable Eddie and his big head emerging from behind the stage, also more use was made of pyrotechnics.

UK magazine Kerrang! summed up the passing year, and readers were asked to select 100 best metal albums of all time, resulting with Piece of Mind ranked first, followed by The Number of the Beast, and the band's other releases were all in the Top 50. The rankings in other regions of the world looked similar. Iron Maiden became the most serious contenders for the title of "the biggest heavy metal formation in the world". In the year of the premiere, the circulation of the fourth album exceeded 2 million copies sold. In September 1983, the band released a video compilation, Video Pieces, which contained official clips from The Number of the Beast and Piece of Mind.

Soon after the success of Piece of Mind and its supporting tour, the band released their fifth studio album, Powerslave, on 9 September 1984. The album features the singles "2 Minutes to Midnight" and "Aces High", an emotional title track, as well as "Rime of the Ancient Mariner", which is based on Samuel Taylor Coleridge's poem of the same name and has a runtime of over 13 minutes. Powerslave was another chart success, reaching No. 12 on the Billboard 200 and No. 2 in the UK as a result of band's record company EMI's third Now That's What I Call Music! pop compilation, which should not be listed.

The tour following the album, dubbed the World Slavery Tour, was the band's largest to date, consisting of 193 shows in 28 countries over 13 months, playing to an estimated three and a half million people. The most elaborate tour to date was famous for using custom-made props, such as extensible golden sarcophagi, a  Eddie appearing as a big and mummified walking phantom, the conceptual stage set with an Ancient Egyptian motifs and extensive pyrotechnics. The band's own equipment travelled in six  articulated trucks, and touring needed three buses for 60 road crew and two more for the musicians. The PA front system power had 153,000 watts and an additional 21,000 for stage monitors. A custom-built and flexible lighting rig held nearly 800 lamps in vast triangular ramps of moving aluminium. The band's 2008–2009 tour, Somewhere Back in Time World Tour, featured a stage set that largely emulated the World Slavery Tour.

The tour started in August 1984 with five shows in Poland. Iron Maiden were the first Western artists who brought full-scale production behind the Iron Curtain. Average attendance in Poland was estimated as 12,000 people, plus a few thousand outside each night. The inaugural show in Warsaw, held at Torwar Arena, gathered over 14,000 people and 5,000 more listened outside. In Budapest, some 50,000 fans filled a parking lot. Iron Maiden played to full-capacity crowds all over Europe and the UK. 105 dates in North America were massive successes. Many shows were played back to back in the same city, such as in Long Beach, California, where the band played four consecutive concerts at Long Beach Arena for a combined audience of 54,000 fans. In New York City, the band played five nights at Radio City Music Hall, and only Dickinson's falling ill prevented the five scheduled shows from becoming seven.

The band's third official video, entitled Behind the Iron Curtain, was released in October 1984. The World Slavery Tour documentary brought footage of the band touring eastern Europe in 1984, performing shows in the countries visited, and additionally portrayed the musicians as playing at a Polish wedding in Poznań. The video contained two promotional clips for songs from the Powerslave album, brand-new live tracks, and special interviews with musicians and members of the road crew. Behind the Iron Curtain was the first documentary published by a Western artist that pictured them touring the countries of Eastern Bloc. MTV broadcast an expanded version (about one hour long) of the documentary, which became a part of the Live After Death DVD released in February 2008.

Iron Maiden also made their debut appearance in South America, where they co-headlined the Rock in Rio festival with Queen for an estimated 350,000–500,000 in attendance. The tour was physically gruelling for the band, who demanded six months off when it ended (although this was later reduced to four months). This was the first substantial break in the group's history, including the cancellation of a proposed supporting tour for the new live album, with Bruce Dickinson threatening to quit unless the tour ended. In October 1985, Iron Maiden published their first double live album, Live After Death, which was a critical and commercial success, peaking at No. 19 on the Billboard 200 and No. 2 in the UK. The album was recorded at Long Beach Arena and also features additional tracks from four nights at London's Hammersmith Apollo. Live After Death is widely regarded as one of the greatest live albums of all time and has been described by Classic Rock as "the last great live album of the vinyl era" and a seminal heavy metal live release. Along with the album, an official video with the same name was released, and it debuted at No. 1 in the UK charts and topped music video charts worldwide. Live After Death live video was digitally remastered and released in 2008 as a part of the "History of Iron Maiden" series. In November 1985, Iron Maiden were named the best rock and metal band in the world and awarded at Public Choice International. This recognition sealed their status as the biggest heavy metal band in the world.

Experimentation (1986–1989)

Returning from their time off, the band adopted a different style for their 1986 studio album, Somewhere in Time. For the first time in the band's history, synthesised bass and guitars were featured to add textures and layers to the sound. The release charted well across the world, particularly with the single "Wasted Years", but notably included no writing credits from Dickinson, whose material was rejected by the rest of the band. While Dickinson was focused on his own music, guitarist Adrian Smith, who typically collaborated with the vocalist, was "left to [his] own devices" and began writing songs on his own, coming up with "Wasted Years", "Sea of Madness" and "Stranger in a Strange Land", the last of which would be the album's second single. The album was the band's biggest American chart success to date, reaching No. 11 on the Billboard 200 and No. 2 in the UK charts. It almost immediately reached Gold status in the UK and Platinum in the US, where it eventually went Double Platinum, according to band's official biography, Run to the Hills. The Somewhere on Tour production was the most ambitious to date. Somewhere in Time features "Caught Somewhere in Time" as an opening track, the anthemic "Heaven Can Wait" and the progressive epic opus "Alexander the Great" crowning the album. Band used seven or eight 45-foot articulated trucks packed with over 100 tons of equipment, three crowd buses for 60 people and two nightliners for five musicians. The band-owned, customised Turbosound system was probably the biggest in the world used indoors. Total power (PA and stage monitors) was estimated at 180,000 watts. The vast and flexible lighting rig held over 1,100 lamps hung over a futuristic stage set, including flying space ships, inflatable props, laser guns, pyrotechnics, hydraulic stands, backdrops and monumental Eddie's appearance.

Somewhere on Tour was a big success everywhere. The band played 157 shows for two and a half million fans. Eighty-one shows in North America were spectacular success, and the musicians booked the bigger indoor arenas and some stadiums, too. Once again, Iron Maiden visited Poland, Hungary and Yugoslavia to play for tens of thousands fans in each country. A massive UK leg, including six nights at Hammersmith Odeon, was sold out in advance. In October 1987, Iron Maiden released the 12 Wasted Years video documentary, focusing on the history of the band from 1975 to 1987. It included several rare videos and interviews from the band's career, some of which were later included on the 2004 documentary The Early Days. In March 2013, Iron Maiden included the full documentary in a reissue of their 1989 concert film, Maiden England.

The experimentation evident on Somewhere in Time continued on their next album, Seventh Son of a Seventh Son, which was released in 1988. A concept album recorded at Musicland Studios in Munich and based on the 1987 novel Seventh Son by Orson Scott Card, it was the band's first record to include keyboards, which were performed by Harris and Smith. After his contributions were not used for Somewhere in Time, Dickinson's enthusiasm was renewed as his ideas were accepted for this album. Another popular release, it became Iron Maiden's second album to hit No. 1 in the UK charts and reached No. 12 on the Billboard 200. It initially only achieved a Gold certification in the US, in contrast to its four predecessors. The album incorporated many progressive rock influences and spawned three hit singles – "Can I Play with Madness", "The Evil That Men Do" and "The Clairvoyant" – along with the expressive "Moonchild", "Infinite Dreams", an epic title track, "The Prophecy" and "Only the Good Die Young", which was inspired by Aleister Crowley's works.

After the blockbuster tour in North America, Iron Maiden were headliners of the Monsters of Rock festivals in Europe for the first time. They headlined stadiums and festivals in the UK, Germany, Netherlands, Switzerland, France, Italy, Spain, Greece, Czechoslovakia and Hungary. During the following tour, the band headlined the Monsters of Rock festival at Donington Park for the first time on 20 August 1988, playing to the largest crowd in the festival's history, with an estimated 107,000 in attendance. Also included on the bill were Kiss, David Lee Roth, Megadeth, Guns N' Roses and Helloween. The festival was marred, however, by the deaths of two fans in a crowd-surge during Guns N' Roses' performance; the following year's festival was cancelled as a result. The tour concluded with several headline shows in the UK in November and December 1988, with the concerts at the NEC Arena, Birmingham, recorded for a live video, entitled Maiden England. The video debuted at top spots of worldwide music videos charts.

To promote the album, the band hosted an evening of television, radio and press interviews at Castle Schnellenberg in Attendorn, Germany, prior to the record's release, before holding a small number of "secret" club shows under the name "Charlotte and the Harlots" at Empire, Cologne and L'Amour, New York. In May, the group set out on a supporting tour, which saw them perform 103 shows to well over two million people worldwide over seven months. To recreate the album's keyboards onstage, the group recruited Michael Kenney, Steve Harris' bass technician, to play the keys throughout the tour, during which he would perform the song "Seventh Son of a Seventh Son" on a forklift truck under the alias of "The Count" (for which he would wear a black cape and mask). Kenney has acted as the band's live keyboard player ever since, also performing on the band's four following albums before Harris took over as the group's sole studio keyboardist on 2000's Brave New World. Stage set and equipment, which has been taken by band, was transported in dozens of trucks and was the most elaborate to date and one of the biggest in the world, including over 200,000 watts of PA and over 1,500 spot lamps. Iron Maiden was included in the Guinness Book of World Records Museum for its performance at the Monsters of Rock festival in 1988.

Upheaval (1989–1994)

During another break in 1989, guitarist Adrian Smith released a solo album with his band ASAP, entitled Silver and Gold. Vocalist Bruce Dickinson began work on a solo album with former Gillan guitarist Janick Gers, releasing Tattooed Millionaire in 1990, followed by a tour. At the same time, to mark the band's 10-year recording anniversary, Iron Maiden released a compilation collection, The First Ten Years, a series of 10 CDs and double 12-inch singles. Between 24 February and 28 April 1990, the individual parts were released one by one, each containing two of Iron Maiden's singles, including the original B-sides. The band also released the career-spanning video compilation entitled The First Ten Years: The Videos (in 1992 re-issued as From There to Eternity). The 1980s were closed by the group with over 25 million albums sold, 10 million of which were in the US, along with over 5 million videos sold in the States, which gave Iron Maiden six of 120 Gold and Platinum certificates received worldwide. The Number of the Beast became the band's best-selling album, achieving sales 6 million copies in the eight years since its release. All the achievements sealed the group's status as the largest representative of the heavy metal genre at the time. Iron Maiden set new records in the UK: six singles in the Top 5, 10 double maxi-singles in the Top 10, the highest position ever for a debut single from a rock band, the most albums in the Top 10 for a British performer (excluding the Rolling Stones, the Beatles and Queen) and 20 singles consecutively released on the charts.

Soon afterwards, Iron Maiden regrouped to work on a new studio record. During the pre-production stages, Adrian Smith left the band due to differences with Steve Harris regarding the direction the band should be taking, disagreeing with the "stripped down" style that they were leaning towards. Janick Gers, having worked on Dickinson's solo project, was chosen to replace Smith and became the band's first new member in seven years. The album, No Prayer for the Dying, was released in October 1990. It contained the hit singles "Holy Smoke" and "Bring Your Daughter... to the Slaughter", the band's first – and, to date, only – UK Singles Chart No. 1, originally recorded by Dickinson's solo outfit for the soundtrack to A Nightmare on Elm Street 5: The Dream Child. The song was banned by the BBC, and only a 90-second live clip on Top of the Pops was shown. In 1990, Bruce Dickinson received the Golden Raspberry Awards in category "The Worst Original Song" for the band's most successful single in Great Britain. Dickinson's composition was nominated to an American Music Award in category "Best Rock Song". In 1992, "Bring Your Daughter... to the Slaughter" received another nomination to Brit Awards in category "Best British Single". Iron Maiden's eighth studio album debuted at No. 2 in the UK albums chart and No. 17 on the Billboard 200. No Prayer for the Dying signalled the return of Iron Maiden to the roots of their musical style, in particular in its simplicity of composition and raw sound.

The No Prayer on the Road tour was booked for 120 shows in Europe, North America and Japan. The main support act for Iron Maiden were an American thrash metal band called Anthrax. The tour started with 20 dates in British music theatres and was continued in European and American arenas. Thirty-three shows in continental Europe were sold out to 530,000 fans. In 1991, Iron Maiden played North America, Japan and outdoors in France, Denmark and Switzerland. For the first time, the band headlined Roskilde Festival for 60,000 fans. Following large-scale stage shows the band played in the '80s, musicians opted for a less elaborate production, including only mobile and the big Eddie, traditional lighting rig and large backdrops. Once again, Iron Maiden played for some two million fans.

After another extensive tour and some more time off, the band recorded their next studio album, Fear of the Dark, which was released in 1992. The title track is now a regular fixture in the band's concert setlists. Achieving their third No. 1 in the UK albums chart and No. 12 on the Billboard 200, the release also included the No. 2 single "Be Quick or Be Dead", the No. 21 single "From Here to Eternity", "Wasting Love" and pacifistic anthem "Afraid to Shoot Strangers", which is based on the 1990–91 Gulf War. The album featured the first songwriting by Gers, and no collaboration at all between Harris and Dickinson on songs. The extensive worldwide tour that followed included their first-ever Latin American leg (12 stadium and arena shows after a single concert during the World Slavery Tour), and headlining the Monsters of Rock festivals in seven European countries: UK, Germany, Spain, France, Italy, Switzerland and Sweden. Iron Maiden's second performance at Donington Park, for a sold-out audience of 75,000 (the attendance was capped after the incident in 1988), was filmed for the audio and video release Live at Donington and featured a guest appearance by Adrian Smith, who joined the band to perform "Running Free". Christian organisations prevented Iron Maiden from performing in Chile and accused musicians of being "emissaries of satanic propaganda".

Fear of the Dark Tour 1992 included 66 concerts played on five continents for well over a million fans. The band presented a powerful and elaborated lighting rig (over 1000 lamps and lasers) and scenery partly reminiscent of the 1980s. The setting of the Monsters of Rock concerts was completed by the huge Eddie crowning the stage and screens. Iron Maiden made their first appearance in Iceland and returned to Oceania after a seven-year hiatus. The tour in Japan was the largest in the history of the group. The tour witnessed the personal conflicts between Bruce Dickinson and rest of the band.

In 1993, Bruce Dickinson left the band to further pursue his solo career, but agreed to remain for a farewell tour and two live albums (later re-released in one package): the first, A Real Live One, was released in March 1993 and featured songs from 1986 to 1992, and the second, A Real Dead One, was released after Dickinson had left the band and featured songs from 1980 to 1984. The tour did not go well, with Steve Harris claiming that Dickinson would only perform properly for high-profile shows, and that at several concerts, he would only mumble into the microphone. Dickinson denied that he was under-performing, stating that it was impossible to "make like Mr. Happy Face if the vibe wasn't right", and that news of his exit from the band had prevented any chance of a good atmosphere during the tour. On 1 May 1993, the band performed at the "Primo Maggio Free Festival" in Rome, Piazza San Giovanni. According to different sources, the crowd was estimated between 500,000 and 1 million people. The band toured an extensive Italian leg and visited Russia for the very first time, playing three consecutive nights at Moscow's Olympic Stadium. Bruce Dickinson played his farewell show with Iron Maiden on 28 August 1993. The show was filmed, broadcast by the BBC and released on video under the name Raising Hell.

Blaze Bayley era, The X Factor and Virtual XI (1994–1999)

In 1994, the title track from Fear of the Dark album received a Grammy Awards nomination for "Best Metal Performance", a first for Iron Maiden. The band listened to hundreds of tapes sent in by vocalists before convincing Blaze Bayley, formerly of the band Wolfsbane, who had supported Iron Maiden in 1990, to audition for them. Harris' preferred choice from the outset, Bayley had a different vocal style from his predecessor and ultimately received a mixed reception among fans.

After a three-year hiatus from studio releases – a record for the band at the time – Iron Maiden returned in 1995. Releasing their next studio album, The X Factor, the band had their lowest chart position since 1981 for an album in the UK (debuting at No. 8). The album would go on to win "Album of the Year" awards in France, Spain and Germany. After more than 10 years of Iron Maiden's constant domination in the readers' polls of Kerrang! magazine, the band's founder Steve Harris received the prestigious "Kerrang Kreativity Award". The record included the 11-minute epic "Sign of the Cross", the band's longest song since "Rime of the Ancient Mariner", as well as the singles "Man on the Edge" (based on the film Falling Down) and "Lord of the Flies", based on the novel of the same name. The release is notable for its "dark" tone, inspired by Steve Harris' divorce. The band toured for the rest of 1995 and 1996, playing for the first time in Israel and South Africa; Malta, Bulgaria, Romania in Europe; and ending in the Americas. The biggest show of the whole tour was a headline appearance for 60,000 people at the Monsters of Rock festival in São Paulo, Brazil.

Generally, Iron Maiden booked smaller venues, including clubs, theatres and mid-size arenas, especially in the States. The band played in stadiums and large arenas in South America and resurged with mainstream popularity in Greece. The stage production was smaller than previous years but included many elements Iron Maiden were famous for: two Eddies, mobile lighting rig, conceptual stage set or backdrops. The X Factor sold 1.3 million copies, the lowest sales result since 1981. After the tour, Iron Maiden released a compilation album, Best of the Beast. The band's first compilation, it included a new single, "Virus", in which the lyrics attack the critics, who had recently written off the band. Initially, the musicians planned to release a video compilation but quit due to the unsatisfying quality of available video remastering.

In 1998, Iron Maiden released Virtual XI, whose chart scores were the band's lowest to date, failing to score 1 million worldwide sales for the first time in the band's history. The album peaked at No. 16 in the UK, the band's lowest for a new studio record. At the same time, Steve Harris assisted in remastering the band's entire discography, up to and including Live at Donington (which was given a mainstream release for the first time). Virtual XI features the singles "The Angel and the Gambler" and "Futureal", as well as epic opus entitled "Clansman" and the power ballad "Como Estais Amigos", which is dedicated to all of the people who died in Falklands War. "Futureal" stood for two weeks at the first position on US Metal Radio charts.

Prior to the album's release, the band organised a publicity tour in which they held football matches in different European countries with some guest musicians and pro-footballers from the UK and Europe. Following the more "back to the basics" stage sets that they had been using following 1988's Seventh Tour of a Seventh Tour, they returned to a conception of an elaborate stage set. The musicians and management stated Virtual XI World Tour would bring a "massive show, with huge production, including stadium-levelling amounts of pyro". They also announced the participation of Dave Lights, who did their lighting and effects in the 1980s. Management booked more mid-size arenas and stadiums in Latin America, including a headline show at the Monsters of Rock festival in Buenos Aires, Argentina, as the final show of the tour. Finally, the band used bigger backdrops, more elaborate lighting rigs, a conceptual stage set and an inflatable Eddie head and hands, which embraced both sides of the stage. Fans did not see pyrotechnics and the kind of production comparable with '80s monumental stage sets as it was previously announced. The tour was a big disappointment, both to the band and the fans.

Bayley's tenure in Iron Maiden ended in January 1999 when he was asked to leave during a band meeting. The dismissal took place due to issues Bayley had experienced with his voice during the Virtual XI World Tour, although Janick Gers stated that this was partly the band's fault for forcing him to perform songs pitched outside the natural range of his voice.

Return of Dickinson and Smith, Brave New World (1999–2002)

While the group were considering a replacement for Bayley, Rod Smallwood convinced Steve Harris to invite Bruce Dickinson back into the band. Although Harris admitted that he "wasn't really into it" at first, he then thought, "'Well, if the change happens, who should we get?' The thing is, we know Bruce and we know what he's capable of, and you think, 'Well, better the devil you know.' I mean, we got on well professionally for, like, eleven years, and so ... after I thought about it, I didn't really have a problem with it."

The band entered into talks with Dickinson, who agreed to rejoin during a meeting in Brighton in January 1999, along with guitarist Adrian Smith, who was telephoned a few hours later. With Gers, Smith's replacement, remaining, Iron Maiden now had a three-guitar line-up (called "The Three Amigos"), and embarked on a hugely successful reunion tour. Dubbed The Ed Hunter Tour, it tied in with the band's newly released greatest hits collection, Ed Hunter, whose track listing was decided by a poll on the group's website, and also contained a computer game of the same name starring the band's mascot. The 1999 reunion tour was the biggest enterprise in terms of production since Fear of the Dark Tour 1992. The band visited North America and several European countries to present the conceptual show inspired by scenes from the game. Iron Maiden used a two-part stage related to graphics from the promoted game, three movable screens surrounded by light ramps, projectors, huge backdrops, pyrotechnics (for the first time since 1988), colourful props, visuals and two types of Eddie in the version known from the game. The equipment travelled in seven huge trucks.

One of Dickinson's primary concerns on rejoining the group "was whether we would in fact be making a real state-of-the-art record and not just a comeback album," which eventually took the form of 2000's Brave New World. Having disliked the results from Harris' personal studio, Barnyard Studios located on his property in Essex, which had been used for the last four Iron Maiden studio albums, the band recorded the new release at Guillaume Tell Studios in Paris, France in November 1999 with producer Kevin Shirley. New release was promoted by two singles "The Wicker Man" and "Out of the Silent Planet", both of them achieving success on the UK singles chart. Thematic influences continued with "The Wicker Man" – based on the 1973 British cult film of the same name – and "Brave New World" – a title taken from the Aldous Huxley novel of the same name. The album furthered the more progressive and melodic sound present in some earlier recordings, with elaborate song structures and keyboard orchestration. The album was a commercial and an artistic success and is considered a modern classic alongside the band's releases from the '80s. Brave New World charted at No. 7 in the UK Album Charts and No. 39 on the Billboard 200 and Top 5 in many other territories, and eventually went Gold and Platinum in a dozen other countries worldwide. The album re-established the band as a "metal powerhouse".

The reunion world tour that followed consisted of well over 100 dates (including 31 shows of the 1999 tour), and culminated on 19 January 2001 in a show at the Rock in Rio festival in Brazil, where Iron Maiden played to an audience of over 250,000. While the performance was being produced for a CD and a highly successful DVD release in March 2002, under the name Rock in Rio, the band took a year off from touring, during which they played three consecutive shows at Brixton Academy in aid of former drummer Clive Burr, who had recently announced that he had been diagnosed with multiple sclerosis. The band performed two further concerts for Burr's MS Trust Fund charity in 2005, and 2007, before his death in 2013.

During the 2000–2002 tour, Iron Maiden played 91 shows for over two million people in 33 countries. The band visited big arenas, stadiums and performed at the biggest festivals. The world tour dubbed "Metal 2000 Tour" was a great undertaking, the main aim of which was to restore the concert glory of the band from the '80s. Iron Maiden used a huge lighting rig with moving parts and 600 lamps, pyrotechnics, a walking Eddie and a large wicker Eddie with dancers in the center, a burning cross lifting Bruce Dickinson up, alongside backdrops and conceptual scenery related to the Brave New World album cover illustration. In addition to their touring success, the band were nominated twice for the annual Grammy Awards and received the International Achievement Award at the 2001 Ivor Novello Awards, in recognition of Maiden's reign as one of Great Britain's biggest musical exports Iron Maiden was hailed as the most successful British metal group on British Channel 4, and The Number of the Beast album was included in the prestigious Eagle Vision's "Classic Albums" series. In 2001 the band won a gong at the Online Music Awards Germany in the category, "Best Artist Website".

In November 2002, Iron Maiden released their third "best of" compilation Edward the Great, and a limited edition of a very special collector's metal casket entitled Eddie's Archive. The special box included three double CDs: BBC Archives, Beast over Hammersmith and Best of the 'B' Sides with unique live recordings from Reading Festivals 1980 and 1982, Donington's Monsters of Rock Festival 1988, BBC Rock Friday 1979, songs from B-sides of particular singles and a live recording of London's Hammersmith Odeon 1982 in its entirety. As special fan souvenir, the box included a parchment scroll with the band's family tree (by Pete Frame), a customised shot glass and a metal ring.

Dance of Death and A Matter of Life and Death (2003–2007)

In June 2003 Iron Maiden released a double DVD promo-video compilation entitled Visions of the Beast, which went multi-platinum worldwide. At the same period, the band began a promotional tour for the new DVD and forthcoming album. The summer leg of the tour's run was entitled the Give Me Ed... 'Til I'm Dead Tour and included 57 shows in Europe and North America. They played indoor arenas, stadiums, American amphitheaters and headlined large festivals such as Roskilde, Heineken Jammin' Festival, Rock am Ring and Rock im Park (combined attendance of 130,000) and the first Download Festival held at Donington Park as a successor to Monsters of Rock. The Spanish leg of the 2003 tour spanned nine shows, with 160,000 fans in attendance. This was the most successful attendance record for the band in that territory in band's career. 28 more shows were played in Europe to 720,000 fans and Iron Maiden visited the US and Canada to play 29 shows for the hundreds of thousands of people. Fans were treated to classic material, alongside the brand new song "Wildest Dreams", the first promotional single from the forthcoming studio album. The tour was another visual attraction, the stage set and theme referring to the most popular incarnations of Eddie along with all the lighting effects and pyrotechnics fans had come to expect. There was also a public lobotomy of the group's mascot taking place during the song "Iron Maiden".

Following their Give Me Ed... 'Til I'm Dead Tour in the summer of 2003, Iron Maiden released Dance of Death, their thirteenth studio album, which was met with worldwide critical and commercial success. The album reached No. 2 on the UK Albums Chart and No. 18 on the Billboard 200. Produced by Kevin Shirley, now the band's regular producer, many critics felt that this release matched up to their earlier efforts, such as Killers, Piece of Mind and The Number of the Beast. As usual, historical, and literary references were present, with "Montségur" in particular, focussing on the Cathar stronghold conquered in 1244, and "Paschendale" relating to the significant battle which took place during the First World War. The album features the successful singles "Wildest Dreams" and "Rainmaker", alongside the epic title track and live favourite "No More Lies". No More Lies was released as an EP on 29 March 2004 and featured the track alongsided an orchestral version of Paschendale and an 'electric' version of the song "Journeyman". "Journeyman", a departure for the band, featured on the album as a mostly acoustic ballad, something that had not been attempted since the song "Prodigal Son" had appeared on "Killers" in 1982. The album also touted the first ever song composed by drummer Nicko McBrain entitled "The New Frontier". The band recorded the album at London's Sarm West Studios which they used again for the following album in 2006.

The Dance of Death Tour 2003–04 began in September 2003 and was the band's most theatrical tour to date. The stage portrayed a medieval castle with an opening gates, Grim Reaper statues on either side of the stage, large towers, and two versions of Eddie as the ominous Grim Reaper character. Bruce Dickinson used many props and costumes, such as a sinister black coat, carnival masks, a throne, and a World War I uniform and helmet. During the performance of "Paschendale", fans witnessed the stage being transformed into a battlefield, with deceased soldier mannequins, trenches, barbed wire and barricades, and the lighting system imitating flashes of explosions that echoed through the powerful sound system. Iron Maiden played 53 shows visiting European indoor arenas, North America, Latin American stadiums and Japan. During the tour, members of the band took a part in charity football events called Music Soccer Six. In 2004 Iron Maiden received the Special Achievement Award at the Nordoff-Robbins Silver Clef awards. During the album tour, the band's performance at Westfalenhalle, in Dortmund, Germany, was recorded and released in August 2005 as a live album and DVD, entitled Death on the Road.

In 2005, the band announced the Eddie Rips Up the World Tour, which, tying in with their 2004 DVD entitled The History of Iron Maiden – Part 1: The Early Days, only featured material from their first four albums and was the first of three retrospective tours in the "History of Iron Maiden" series referring to the '80s. As part of this celebration of their earlier years, "The Number of the Beast" single was re-released and went straight to No. 3 in the UK Chart. The tour included many headlining stadium and festival dates, including a performance at Ullevi Stadium in Sweden to an audience of almost 60,000. This concert was also broadcast live on satellite television all over Europe to approximately 60 million viewers. The tour was the first step in transforming the reborn Iron Maiden into a stadium-size band. The stage production was larger than ever before and reflected the visual elements from the tours promoting the group's first four albums. The band used more backdrops, several incarnations of Eddie, and a more powerful lighting rig with triangular ramps, trusses and pyrotechnics.

Following this run of European shows, the band co-headlined the US festival tour, Ozzfest, with Black Sabbath. An average Ozzfest concert attendance was estimated at 30,000 people. The San Bernardino show before 50,000 fans earned international press coverage after it was sabotaged by singer Ozzy Osbourne's family, who took offence to Dickinson's remarks about reality television, in what became known as The Eggfest Incident. The band completed the tour by headlining the Reading and Leeds Festivals on 26–28 August, and the RDS Stadium in Ireland on 31 August. For the second time, the band played a charity show for The Clive Burr MS Trust Fund, which took place at the Hammersmith Apollo. That same year, the band were inducted into the Hollywood RockWalk on Sunset Boulevard, Los Angeles. In the same period, Iron Maiden were inducted into the Kerrang! Hall of Fame.

At the end of 2005, Iron Maiden began work on A Matter of Life and Death, their fourteenth studio album, released in autumn 2006. While not a concept album, war and religion are recurring themes in the lyrics, as well as in the cover artwork. The release was a critical and commercial success, earning the band their first top ten on the Billboard 200 and debuting at number one in the album charts of 13 countries The new effort featured the singles, "Different World" and "The Reincarnation of Benjamin Breeg", but the album itself grabbed critical attention for its focus on dark themes and reflections on the futility of war. It was also noted for progressive compositions such as "Brighter Than a Thousand Suns", "The Longest Day", "For the Greater Good of God" and "The Legacy". Among many accolades, Maiden's fourteenth album received the Album of the Year award at the 2006 Classic Rock Roll of Honour Awards.

A supporting tour followed, during which they played the album in its entirety; response to this was mixed. Iron Maiden played in North America, Japan and Europe selling out indoor arenas everywhere. They played multiple shows in venues such as the Earls Court Exhibition Centre in London, Forum di Assago in Milano, and Globen Arena in Stockholm or Hartwall Arena in Helsinki. The setting of the 2006–07 tour was an extension of the ideas accompanying the presentation of the song "Paschendale" from the Dance of Death tour. The stage set resembled a battlefield fortification featuring sand bags, barricades, trenches and the like. Movable light ramps were covered with camouflage netting and khaki fabric. There were also uniformed paratrooper mannequins woven into the scene. Additional lighting was also used, and at the climax of the show, the set turned into a huge moving tank.

The second part of the "A Matter of Life and Death" tour, which took place in 2007, was dubbed "A Matter of the Beast" to celebrate the 25th anniversary of The Number of the Beast album's release, and included appearances at several major festivals and stadiums worldwide. The tour opened in the Middle East with the band's first ever performance in Dubai at the Dubai Desert Rock Festival for 25,000 people, after which they played to over 40,000 people at the Bangalore Palace Grounds, marking the first concert by any major heavy metal band in the Indian sub-continent.

The band went on to play a string of European dates, including an appearance at Download Festival, their fourth headline performance at Donington Park, to approximately 80,000 people. Iron Maiden performed at Olympic Stadium (Rome) in Rome, Bazaly Stadium in Ostrava, Lokomotiv Stadium in Sofia, Sudweststadion in Ludwigshafen, Fair Arena in Belgrade, Bezigrad Stadion in Ljubjana, and played shows in the big indoor arenas of Düsseldorf and Athens. Finally, the band headlined the BBK Live Festival in Bilbao, Graspop Metal Meeting in Dessel, Fields of Rock Festival in Biddinghuizen, and the Heineken Jammin Festival in Venice. On 24 June they ended the tour with a performance at London's Brixton Academy in aid of The Clive Burr MS Trust fund.

The four consecutive world tours, two successful studio albums and three DVD releases cemented Iron Maiden's status as the one of the most relevant and successful metal bands in the world. During the period of 2003–2007, Iron Maiden released two studio albums and played 215 shows to combined audience estimated at five million people.

Somewhere Back in Time World Tour and Flight 666 (2007–2009)

On 5 September 2007, the band announced their Somewhere Back in Time World Tour, which tied in with the DVD release of their Live After Death album. The setlist for the tour consisted of successes from the 1980s, with a specific emphasis on the Powerslave era for set design. The first part of the tour, commencing in Mumbai, India on 1 February 2008, consisted of 24 concerts in 21 cities, travelling nearly 50,000 miles in the band's own chartered aeroplane, named "Ed Force One". They played their first ever concerts in Costa Rica and Colombia and their first shows in Australia and Puerto Rico since 1992.

The tour led to the release of a new compilation album, entitled Somewhere Back in Time, which included a selection of tracks from their 1980 eponymous debut to 1988's Seventh Son of a Seventh Son, as well as several live versions from Live After Death. The tour turned out to be the biggest concert undertaking in the group's history so far. Iron Maiden have performed in huge stadiums and arenas in every corner of the world. Only seven concerts in Scandinavia saw over 250,000 viewers gathered at such venues as Ullevi Stadion, Olympiastadion in Stockholm and Helsinki, Ratina Stadion in Finland and Valle Hovin in Oslo. According to Live Nation Scandinavia, the band attracted the largest audience ever for a rock artist in this region of Europe. In 2008–09 in Latin America, the musicians gave as many as 27 concerts for about a million people in total. It was a record for a heavy rock performer.

The Somewhere Back in Time World Tour continued with two further legs in the US and Europe in the summer of 2008, during which the band used a more expansive stage-set, including further elements of the original Live After Death show. With the sole UK concert taking place at Twickenham Stadium, this would be the first time the band would headline a stadium in their own country. The three 2008 legs of the tour were remarkably successful; it was the second highest-grossing tour of the year for a British artist.

The last part of the tour took place in February and March 2009, with the band, once again, using "Ed Force One". The final leg included the band's first ever appearances in Peru and Ecuador, as well as their return to Venezuela and New Zealand after 17 years. The band also played another show in India (their third in the country within a span of 2 years) at the Rock in India festival to a crowd of 20,000. At their concert in São Paulo on 15 March, Dickinson announced on stage that it was the largest non-festival show of their career, with an overall attendance of 100,000 people. The final leg ended in Florida on 2 April after which the band took a break. Overall, the tour reportedly had an attendance of over two and a half million people worldwide over both years. At the 2009 Brit Awards, Iron Maiden won the award for best British live act. Voted for by the public, the band reportedly won by a landslide.

On 20 January 2009, the band announced that they were to release a full-length documentary film in select cinemas on 21 April 2009. Entitled Iron Maiden: Flight 666, it was filmed during the first part of the Somewhere Back in Time World Tour between February and March 2008. Flight 666 was co-produced by Banger Productions and was distributed in cinemas by Arts Alliance Media and EMI, with D&E Entertainment sub-distributing in the US. The film went on to have a Blu-ray, DVD, and CD release in May and June, topping the music DVD charts in 25 countries. In most of them the release went Gold, Platinum or Multi-Platinum.

The Final Frontier and Maiden England World Tour (2010–2014)

Following announcements that the band had begun composition of new material and booked studio time in early 2010 with Kevin Shirley producing, The Final Frontier was announced on 4 March and featured three singles "The Final Frontier", "El Dorado" and "Coming Home", as well as epic, progressive opuses such as "Isle of Avalon", "The Talisman" and "When The Wild Wind Blows". The album, the band's fifteenth, was released on 16 August, garnering critical acclaim and the band's greatest commercial success in their current history, reaching No. 1 in twenty-eight countries worldwide. The Final Frontier debuted at No. 4 on Billboard 200 reaching the highest American album charts position to date. Although Steve Harris had been quoted in the past as claiming that the band would only produce fifteen studio releases, band members have since confirmed that there will be at least one further record. The album was band's next commercial success, achieving Gold or Platinum status in 24 countries around the world. Iron Maiden were awarded with the special sales recognition plaque for selling over 750,000 of their albums in Finland.

The album's supporting tour saw the band perform 101 shows across the globe to an estimated audience of well over two and a half million, including their first visits to Singapore, Indonesia, and South Korea, before concluding in London on 6 August 2011. As the tour's 2010 leg preceded The Final Frontiers release, the band made "El Dorado" available as a free download on 8 June, which would go on to win the award for Best Metal Performance at the 2011 Grammy Awards on 13 February 2011. It was the band's first win following two previous Grammy nominations ("Fear of the Dark" in 1994 and "The Wicker Man" in 2001). During both years of the tour band headlined the biggest festivals in the world, including Rock Werchter, Roskilde, Nova Rock, Pukkelpop, Soundwave (five dates), Wacken, Sziget, Ottawa Bluesfest, Festival d'été de Québec also Sonisphere Festival dates in the UK, Sweden, Finland, Poland, Czech Republic, Bulgaria, Italy, Spain, Greece, Turkey and Switzerland. Iron Maiden played in the big indoor arenas, stadiums and festivals around the world, sometimes for 100,000 people.

On 15 March, a new compilation to accompany 2009's Somewhere Back in Time was announced. Entitled From Fear to Eternity, the original release date was set at 23 May, but was later delayed to 6 June. The double disc set covers the period 1990–2010 (the band's most recent eight studio albums), and, as on Somewhere Back in Time, live versions with Bruce Dickinson were included in place of original recordings which featured other vocalists, in this case Blaze Bayley.

In a press release regarding From Fear to Eternity, band manager Rod Smallwood revealed that Iron Maiden would release a new concert video to DVD in 2011, filmed in Santiago, Chile and Buenos Aires, Argentina during The Final Frontier World Tour. On 17 January 2012, the band announced that the new release, entitled En Vivo!, based on footage from the Chile concert, would be made available worldwide on CD, LP, DVD, and Blu-ray on 26 March, except for the United States and Canada (where it was released on 27 March). DVD topped the music video charts around the world to achieve similar success as previous ones. In addition to the concert footage, the video release includes an 88-minute tour documentary, entitled Behind The Beast, containing interviews with the band and their crew. In December 2012, one song from the release ("Blood Brothers") was nominated for a Grammy Award for Best Hard Rock/Metal Performance at the 2013 Grammy Awards.

The Final Frontier World Tour set design referred to the visual conventions known from the cover of The Final Frontier album. It resembled a modified space station (Satellite–15), crowned with 10-meter radar towers with spotlights. The lighting system was developed the most since 2000 and it consisted of two semicircular ramps and triangular modules with sets of various light points. Two versions of Eddie the Alien were also prepared, the movable one and in the form of a huge monster's bust and paws emerging from behind the stage. Panoramic backdrops referred to the illustrations contained in the booklet of the promoted album.

On 15 February 2012, the band announced their third retrospective Maiden England World Tour 2012–14, which was based around the video of the same name. The tour commenced in North America in the summer of 2012 and was followed by further dates in 2013 and 2014, which included the band's record-breaking fifth headline performance at Donington Park with 100,000 fans in attendance, their first show at the newly built national stadium in Stockholm, a return to the Rock in Rio festival in Brazil, and their debut appearance in Paraguay. In August 2012, Steve Harris stated that the Maiden England video would be re-issued in 2013, with a release date later set for 25 March 2013 in DVD, CD, and LP formats under the title Maiden England '88.

Maiden England World Tour stage set was built in an Arctic-style in many aspects reminding Seventh Tour of a Seventh Tour. The band presented wraparound stage including some special platforms and podiums. Stage set and backdrops portrayed a dozen of the frozen pictures of Eddie monster. Fans could see the three incarnations of band's mascot and movable, custom-made elements of stage props as organs with silver pipes, frozen sculptures of Eddie, the crystal ball and movable lighting rig imitating construction from an era of 1988. Iron Maiden decided to extend the pyrotechnics using even more than on previous tours, as Bruce Dickinson said "we like to alternate it every other year, because if you get the reputation that you've got to go and see a band because of the pyro and then you don't do the pyro, people think, 'Oh, I won't bother then." The tour was even bigger logistical challenge than a few previous ones. Michele Stokley, organiser of Sarnia Bayfest stated, Iron Maiden "brought 22 tractor trailers and the [six] buses full of equipment for the show".

Iron Maiden closed their Maiden England World Tour in July 2014 headlining at Sonisphere Festival, Knebworth. Musicians have impressed the crowds by having The Great War Display Team featuring Bruce Dickinson among its pilots, stage a sensational aerial dogfight in the skies above the Festival with band's frontman flying his very own WW1 German Fokker Dr1, just hours before taking to the stage. Iron Maiden headlining show marked the final chapter in the band's trilogy of tours performing their 80's repertoire. The historical tour was another big commercial success in band's career. Over three years, 100 shows were undertaken in 32 countries before an estimated audience of not less than two million and a seven hundred thousand people. Throughout the tour, consistent praise was received from music critics, with the band's performances and the stage show receiving very particular acclaim. Third retrospective tour established Iron Maiden's status as a stadium–filling band.

In 2013 Iron Maiden in collaboration with "Robinsons Brewery" released their own beer called Trooper Ale. Since its launch, the 4.7% Premium British Beer that was Trooper original has become a leading player amongst British ales, exported to over 100 countries around the world. Back in 2015 Iron Maiden and their management were honored with a very special Golden Disc Award for trespassing the 10 million Trooper Ale sales threshold. In 2021 the band and "Robinsons Brewery" have been celebrating over 30 million Trooper pints sold around the globe, during the week they marked the 8th Birthday of their hugely successful collaboration. Trooper has also won multiple gold medals at the prestigious British Bottlers' Institute Awards, as well as picking up awards at the World Beer Awards, Global Beer Masters, International Beer Challenge and International Brewing and Cider Awards (aka "Oscars of the brewing and cider world") among many others.

The Book of Souls, Legacy of the Beast, and Senjutsu (2015–present)

Following confirmation from the group that 2010's The Final Frontier would not be their last album, Bruce Dickinson revealed plans for a sixteenth studio record in July 2013, with a potential release date in 2015. In February 2015, drummer Nicko McBrain revealed that a new album had been completed, although the release was put on hold as Dickinson was recovering from treatment for a cancerous tumour found on his tongue. On 15 May, after Dickinson was cleared for activities, manager Rod Smallwood confirmed that the album would be released in 2015, although the band would not tour until 2016 to allow Dickinson to continue recuperating. On 18 June 2015, the band's website announced its title, The Book of Souls, and confirmed a release date of 4 September 2015. It is the band's first original studio album not to be issued by EMI outside North America, following Parlophone's acquisition by Warner Music Group in 2013. It was a critical and commercial success, becoming the band's fifth UK No. 1 album and second No. 4 on Billboard 200 in the US. The new release reached number one positions in the album charts of 43 countries. Iron Maiden received many accolades and prestigious awards including The Rocks Awards, Silver Clef Award in recognition of outstanding contribution to UK music, Bandit Rock Awards, Classic Rock Roll of Honour Awards, ECHO Award, Kerrang! Awards, Loudwire Awards, Burrn! Awards, Metal Hammer Germany Awards, Golden Gods Awards among many others. The Book of Souls went Gold and Platinum in twenty countries.

The new record was recorded at Guillaume Tell Studios, Paris, which they had previously used for 2000's Brave New World, with regular producer Kevin Shirley in late summer 2014. With a total run time of 92 minutes, it is the group's first double studio album. In addition, the release's closing song, "Empire of the Clouds", penned by Dickinson, surpassed "Rime of the Ancient Mariner" (from 1984's Powerslave) as Iron Maiden's longest song, at 18 minutes in length. A music video for the song "Speed of Light" was issued on 14 August. Apart from an aforementioned songs double album features epic tracks as the title one and Dickinson's "If Eternity Should Fail" referring to Mayan mythology, heavy rock hits such as "Death or Glory" and "Tears of a Clown" dedicated to late actor Robin Williams, progressive opuses as "The Great Unknown" and "The Man of Sorrows" or the more complex, "The Red and the Black".

The touring setting was (once again) one of the best in the career of the six-person line-up to date. Referring to the title and the leading topic of the album, the stage set reflected the architectural solutions characteristic of the ancient Maya religious buildings. The group's mascot, Eddie the Head, appeared in a movable version, as the Mayan shaman, during the concert presentation of the title track from the album and as its big version during the presentation of "Iron Maiden" composition. This one was presenting by a huge (ten meters), inflatable and exploding bust known from the album's cover painted by Mark Wilkinson. The band used an extensive pyrotechnics, lasers, movable lighting rig based on a dozen of pillars. The construction was built on a pyramid plan, with a circular, movable target placed in the central point, around which multicolored LED floodlights were mounted, giving the effect of light reflecting on the audience.

The individual segments of the stage design, were placed on the stage's podium, as well as the two stepped towers placed in the back of the stage on its extreme sides. Initially they were turned in the opposite direction to the original, during the presentation of selected inscriptions which were properly illuminated, creating the effect of the real buildings. Panoramic backdrops have been changed with each song referred to the graphic convention and paintings from the Mayan era, originally included in the booklet of the promoted album. Bruce Dickinson changed his costumes several times and used a variety of props. Another attraction was an eight-meter long inflatable devil goat doll, emerging from behind the stage during the presentation of "The Number of the Beast" song.

In February 2016, the band embarked on The Book of Souls World Tour, which saw them play concerts in 35 countries in North and South America, Asia, Australasia, Africa, and Europe, including their first ever performances in China, El Salvador, and Lithuania. It was Iron Maiden's biggest album tour since The X Factour 1995–1996. As with 2008–09's Somewhere Back in Time World Tour and 2010–11's The Final Frontier World Tour, the group travelled in a customised aeroplane, flown by Dickinson and nicknamed "Ed Force One", although they used a Boeing 747-400 jumbo jet. The band completed the tour in 2017 with further European and North American shows. Iron Maiden played 117 shows on six continents for well over two and a half million people. On 20 September 2017, The Book of Souls: Live Chapter was announced. Recorded throughout The Book of Souls World Tour, it was released on 17 November 2017. On 11 November 2017 band released for free the entire concert video via YouTube as an official stream for loyal fans around the world. The event was called "Stream For Me, YouTube".

In the summer of 2016, the group launched a mobile game, Iron Maiden: Legacy of the Beast and a pinball game with the same name in 2018. The game has been No. 1 mobile RPG in multiple markets, with over four million players worldwide having downloaded the game. Inspired by the game's title, the band would undertake the Legacy of the Beast World Tour, commencing in Europe in 2018, with North and South American shows following in 2019. 82 shows of the tour attracted over two million fans filling sold-out arenas, stadiums and some of the biggest festivals in the world as Rock in Rio 2019 with well over 100,000 fans in attendance. The band achieved the another impressive success in Latin America, where over half a million viewers saw concerts in six cities of Mexico, Brazil, Argentina and Chile. The 33 shows played in North America were the band's greatest success since their heyday in the mid-1980s. Iron Maiden set record attendance in many European cities.

On 23 September 2019, the band announced they would play the 2020 Belsonic Festival in Belfast and a headline show at Donington Park, England, as part of 2020 Download Festival. On 7 November 2019, they announced Australian shows throughout May 2020 joined by Killswitch Engage. Legacy of The Beast World Tour has been critically acclaimed by fans and media as the most extravagant and visually stunningly live show of the band's career to date. Both the production and the decades-spanning set-list of fan favourites and hits were inspired by their so same named mobile phone game. The multi-themed shows opened with a replica Spitfire flying above the stage and progresses through a two-hour theatrical journey of ever-evolving interlocking stage sets with multiple incarnations of Eddie, pyrotechnics and special effects including muskets, claymores, flame throwers, a giant electrified crucifix, a noose, gallows and an enormous Icarus among many other attractions.

In May 2020, the band announced that all concerts for the year had been cancelled due to the COVID-19 pandemic, with tour dates rescheduled for 2021. Nearly one million people bought tickets for all 35 shows originally booked for 2020. In April 2021 it was announced that the 2021 tour was cancelled once again and most of the European shows were rescheduled for 2022. In October 2020, the band announced that they would release a live album from the Legacy of the Beast World Tour called Nights of the Dead, Legacy of the Beast: Live in Mexico City. The double concert album was recorded during three sold-out concerts in Mexico City's Palacio de los Deportes for a combined audience of over 70,000 people. It was released worldwide on 20 November 2020. That same month, Dickinson announced that Iron Maiden had been "working together a little bit in the studio" for the follow-up to The Book of Souls. On 15 July 2021, Iron Maiden released a video for their first song in six years "The Writing on the Wall", which was directed by Nicos Livesey. Four days later, the band announced that their seventeenth studio album, Senjutsu, would be released on 3 September 2021. On 19 August 2021, the band released another single from the album, "Stratego".

Senjutsu eventually reached the top of the best-seller lists in 27 countries, however it was the band's first album in fifteen years (since A Matter of Life and Death in 2006) not to reach number one on the UK charts, although it did top the UK Rock & Metal Singles and Albums Charts. In the list of sales of physical albums in the UK and the US, the double-disc release took the first position, also noted on the European Album Chart Top 200. Senjutsu was also in the Top 5 physical and digital best-selling albums combined around the world. In South America, the album went on sale only a week after the official date. At the same time as the Iron Maiden album, the latest releases of the most popular representatives of the pop scene and rap such as Drake, Kanye West, Imagine Dragons and Billie Eilish were on the best-seller lists. In total, Senjutsu reached the top three best-sellers in 55 countries around the world and the Top 5 best-sellers in 63 countries. The animated video for "The Writing on the Wall" single was nominated for UK Music Video Awards 2021 in category "Best Animation in a Video". Senjutsu was awarded the title of "Best Metal Album of 2021" by Rolling Stone magazine and took top positions in many summaries of the year around the world. Pollstar has published the ranking of "Top 50 the Most Successful Touring Artists of the Past 40 Years", including the figures of ticket sales in North America monitored by the publisher. Iron Maiden were ranked 34 with 9,2 mln ticket sold in period of 1981 – 2021.

As many previous releases band's seventeenth studio effort was critically acclaimed and commercially successful album, especially appreciated for its ambitious epic scope. The band decided to continue the postponed Legacy of the Beast Tour in 2022 adding next 30+ dates in North America and some new territories in Europe. Tour production was planned as even more spectacular with using a brand new scenery dedicated to Senjutsu album and including the setlist changes to perform songs from the seventeenth studio effort. Iron Maiden manager Rod Smallwood commented: "Next summer we will finally get to play the huge European stadium and festival tour for Legacy of the Beast originally set for 2020. The new show will be even more spectacular so after our visit to Rock in Rio early September 2022 we have decided to take it back to our fans in North America and Mexico too, playing in cities or venues we did not get to last time we toured in 2019. We are also adding some of the great cities of eastern Europe we were not initially visiting! We'll be making a couple of additions and changes to the production and setlist to include some songs from our new album Senjutsu and are making the 2022 version of Legacy of the Beast even more spectacular than the acclaimed original show. You can be sure that we will still be featuring all the 'hits' and the key elements of the original tour like the Spitfire, Icarus, Hell, flamethrowers and pyro and the rest - but we will shake it up a bit and Trooper Eddie will have serious competition in the new 'Senjutsu world' we are adding". During an appearance on the "Talk Is Jericho" podcast, Bruce Dickinson confirmed that Iron Maiden is planning to stage a tour where it will perform Senjutsu double album, in its entirety. With 140 shows, Legacy of the Beast World Tour became the longest tour with Bruce Dickinson on vocals since the "Somewhere on Tour" in 1986–1987. The tour started in Tallinn, Estonia in May 2018 as the very first of 140 shows in 35 countries. Finally the band have played to well over three and a half million people on their biggest world tour so far. The tour was honored with CAA & K2 Award. Iron Maiden played series of stadium dates in Europe and both Americas and headlined Rock in Rio for the fifth time and Donington's rock festival for seventh, attracting circa 100,000 fans for the fourth time in their career.

On 6 October 2022, the band announced that their next tour will be called The Future Past Tour, along with some tour dates in Europe with more dates to follow. The theme of the tour will be a combination of Senjutsu and the underperformed 1986 album Somewhere in Time. According to Steve Harris, the band plans to perform songs which have not been played live for 35 years or even at all before, in addition to tracks from "Senjutsu" and other albums. On 28 October 2022, the band's manager Rod Smallwood confirmed that the Future Past Tour will continue into 2024.

On 1 February 2023 the band received their second nomination for Rock and Roll Hall of Fame class; however, the musicians and their management did not accept the nomination and boycotted the opportunity of appearing among the awarded artists.

Image and legacy

Iron Maiden and particular musicians of the band have received multiple nominations, honours and awards including Grammy Awards and equivalents awards in many countries, Brit Awards, Silver Clef Award, Nordoff-Robbins Award, Ivor Novello Awards, Juno Awards, Guinness Book of World Records, Public Choice International, Online Music Awards Germany, The Rocks Awards, Burrn! Awards, Classic Rock Roll of Honour Awards, ECHO Awards, Top.HR Music Awards, Žebřík Music Awards, honorary Doctorates, State Prizes,sales recognition, marketing achievements recognition awards, charity, film and sport awards among many others. Musicians have also received fourteen awards from twenty-two nominations at the Metal Hammer Golden Gods Awards and Paneuropean Metal Awards combined. The band was ranked No. 24 in VH1's "100 Greatest Artists of Hard Rock", No. 4 in MTV's "Top 10 Greatest Heavy Metal Bands of All Time", No. 3 in VH1 Classic's "Top 20 Metal Bands"., and was ranked as the most successful British metal group on Channel 4. In 2012 The Number of the Beast was voted as Best British Album Ever in the public poll related to Diamond Jubilee of Queen Elizabeth II. Iron Maiden were inducted into Hollywood RockWalk, BPI Hall of Fame and Kerrang! Hall of Fame. The band's movie Flight 666 was a part of prestigious British Music Experience exposition held in London, 2011 and Eddie the Head iconic mascot – monster was presented for the very first time at British Music Experience's doorway in Liverpool in 2017 and became a part of permanent exhibition. Iron Maiden are also a part of permanent exhibition of the Rock and Roll Hall of Fame, Rock in Rio Wall of Fame and Wacken Open Air Hall of Fame. Band's mascot is a part of Rock Legends Wax Museum placed in Ontario. In February 2021, Iron Maiden were nominated for Rock and Roll Hall of Fame class. The second nomination they received on 1 February 2023. In April 2021, ex-members of the band (Paul Di'Anno, Blaze Bayley and famous illustrator Derek Riggs) were inducted into the Metal Hall of Fame.

In January 2023 Iron Maiden were honoured by Royal Mail UK with dedicated postal stamps and cards. The band as 'bona fide' rock legends belongs to an elitarian circle of British iconic bands honoured with a unique range of stamps, including the Rolling Stones, the Beatles, Pink Floyd, Queen and Iron Maiden as the fifth one. Iron Maiden have sold over 130 million copies of their albums worldwide, despite little radio or television support. According to many sources all audio-visual catalogue of the band has sold in over 200 million copies worldwide, including regular albums, singles, compilations, and videos. Their third studio album entitled The Number of the Beast is among the most popular heavy metal albums of all time and the most commercially successful release of the band, having sold almost 20 million copies worldwide. By 2022 their releases have been certified silver, gold and platinum around 600 times worldwide.

Iron Maiden frequently use the slogan "Up the Irons" in their disc liner notes, and the phrase can also be seen on several T-shirts officially licensed by the band. It is a paraphrase of "Up the Hammers", the phrase which refers to the London football club, West Ham United, of which founder Steve Harris is a fan. Collection called "Die With Your Boots On" was published in 2020 as the result of a unique collaboration between Iron Maiden and West Ham United. Band's mascot is the official symbol of Força Jovem youth soccer club Vasco.

Iron Maiden's mascot, Eddie, is a perennial fixture in the band's science fiction and horror-influenced album cover art, as well as in live shows. Originally a papier-mâché mask incorporated in their backdrop which would squirt fake blood during their live shows, the name would be transferred to the character featured in the band's debut album cover, created by Derek Riggs. Eddie was painted exclusively by Riggs until 1992, at which point the band began using artwork from numerous other artists as well, including Melvyn Grant. Eddie is also featured in the band's first-person shooter video game, Ed Hunter, as well as their mobile role-playing game, Iron Maiden: Legacy of the Beast, in addition to numerous T-shirts, posters and other band-related merchandise. In 2008, he was awarded the "Icon Award" at the Metal Hammer Golden Gods, while Gibson.com describes him as "the most recognisable metal icon in the world and one of the most versatile too". In November 2021, the group's management teamed up with Marvel Entertainment. The result of the collaboration was, among others, a series of gadgets containing the image of the most famous characters of Marvel and Eddie. According to the manager of Rod Smallwood, the collaboration was a dream come true, joining the band's mascot to the group of pop culture superheroes such as X-Men, Avengers, Spider-Man, Iron Man, Captain America, Venom, Thanos, Thor or Deadpool.

Iron Maiden became famous from its huge and constantly growing merchandising offer, which is also one of the most characteristic on the market. The beginnings of the group's activity in this field can be traced back to mid-1979, when Keith Wilford, a declared fan of the band, became the president of FC Iron Maiden and was the first to decide to create T-shirts with a characteristic logo. The avalanche of ideas began at the turn of 1979/1980, when the visual artist Derek Riggs, at the request of the manager Rod Smallwood, created the character of a macabre mascot named Eddie The Head, in the long term stimulating the possibility of a multi-threaded continuation of the band's multimedia promotion, using this very characteristic character. Since then, Eddie has been an integral part of the stage and media image of the group, being the hero of the graphics decorating almost every release and accompanying the projects that the musicians of the formation endorse. Both the managerial activities and the influence of the team's management on the creation of the merchandising offer are considered pioneering and groundbreaking in the context of the entire genre. To a large extent, thanks to skillfully created merchandising, Iron Maiden became regarded as the greatest metal band in the world in the mid-1980s.

Regardless of the numerous controversies that the image of Iron Maiden aroused over the next decades, the merchandising offer created on its basis is one of the most impressive in history. As a whole, it includes several thousand versions of all possible gadgets, releases and other products, along with their reissues, on which the logo of the British formation has appeared over the past several decades. Its diversity and versatility can be compared with the no less impressive offer of the American group KISS. According to Enrique Campos, stylist, creative manager and fashion expert: "Eddie T-shirts can be seen everywhere and on all people, even those who have never heard the band's music. Rock is associated with being 'bad', with life on the sidelines. Concepts that part of the public likes to join from time to time, which is why you see chic girls from the Salamanca District wearing their T-shirts".

With the launch of alcoholic products with the group's logo on the market, a wide range of gadgets related to the culture of consumption, bar decor, product storage appeared, including proposals for glassware, dishes and brewing accessories dedicated to the group. The group's official store contains only a small part of the offer, but it is usually divided into several thematic panels, allowing for selective search for product proposals depending on the selected category from the global offer. On the global market, the group's products are available from the best distributors of music gadgets. The group's gadgets were created in cooperation with such market tycoons as Bravado, NECA, Stern Pinball, Incendium, Super7, Nodding Frog, Global Merchandising Services, Funko Pop, EMP, Rock Merch, Backstreet Merch, CMON and many others. In cooperation with the American tycoon CMON, board game sets compatible with the offers of Zombicide, Ankh, Kthulhu, Massive Darkness, Rising Sun were created, which are a tribute to the group's mascot - Eddie, described by the publisher as "The Greatest Heavy Metal Icon of All Time". The sets contained miniatures referring to individual incarnations of the mascot known from the group's publications, which could be used in dedicated board games, also in limited editions. It was the first such a wide offer related to a heavy metal artist.

In 2016, the group launched a mobile game, Iron Maiden: Legacy of the Beast and a pinball game with the same name in 2018. The game has been No. 1 mobile RPG in multiple markets, with over four million players worldwide having downloaded the game. Inspired by the game's title, the band would undertake the Legacy of the Beast World Tour, commencing in Europe in 2018 with North and South American shows following in 2019. Finnish computer game developers Rovio Entertainment have teamed up with the management of Iron Maiden to include Eddie's group mascot as one of the characters creating a special instalment of the game "Angry Birds Evolution", related to the Halloween celebration in 2017. Cooperation with the creators of the game Angry Birds, which has a multi-million audience of users around the world, meant that potentially many of them got a chance to initiate into the world of heavy metal. In May 2019, the band filed a $2 million lawsuit against video game company 3D Realms for infringing on their trademark via the planned release of a game called Ion Maiden, which the band claims "is nearly identical to the Iron Maiden trademark in appearance, sound and overall commercial impression." The suit further accuses 3D Realms of causing "confusion among consumers" by depicting a skull icon similar to the band's Eddie mascot and that Ion Maiden is similar to the band's own Legacy of the Beast video game.

Since 2021, Iron Maiden have welcomed in-game collaborations with the other rock and metal artists. As the first came Amon Amarth with a playable Viking Berserker character, followed by the ethereal Shadow Sorceress, which represented Lacuna Coil's frontwoman Cristina Scabbia and next step was Papa Emeritus of Ghost entering the arena. In 2022, Disturbed's mascot The Guy was brought into battle with mysterious dark powers in the Legacy of the Beast mobile game. Iron Maiden teamed up with German power metal band, Powerwolf, to bring the Battle with Vârcolac (the werewolf) in games character showcase event: Macht Der Wölfe (Power of the Wolf) Queen Beast is the next character appearing in the game, created with collaboration with Swedish melodic death metal band Arch Enemy. On 18 October 2022 Iron Maiden teamed up with Avenged Sevenfold's Deathbats Club for another in-game collaboration. In March 2023, the band established cooperation with the management of the Motörhead formation, the fruit of cooperation became the character of Snaggletooth in the game, known from the covers of Lemmy Kilmister's band albums.

The huge puppet with the image of Eddie has appeared many times during the carnival celebrations in Rio de Janeiro and other South American cities, among other installations resembling the most famous stars of the stage, film, sports and influential personalities of world politics. During the Cavalcade of Magi 2021 in the Spanish city of Cadiz, next to dolls representing characters known from the world of pop culture, there was a huge, inflatable mummy inspired by the characteristic image of the Iron Maiden mascot from 1985. In addition to a wide range of widely available gadgets, the protagonist of which were the subsequent incarnations of the band's mascot, the image of Eddie turned out to be a popular theme for tattoos adorning various parts of the body of thousands of fans of SF / Fantasy aesthetics and heavy varieties of rock music.

Over the course of several decades, the band's cover illustrations and iconography have appeared in various TV productions, music videos by artists representing popular music in the broad sense, and in press publications. The distinctive cover illustrations, especially the group's mascot and logo, have become part of celebrity clothing (especially t-shirts) worn privately, as well as at prestigious industry events, including fashion shows. Among hundreds of others can be found: Lady Gaga, Paris Hilton, Rihanna, Madonna, Rowan Atkinson, Taylor Swift, Taylor Hill, Selena Gomez, David Beckham, David Hasselhoff, Diego Maradona, Kelly Rowland, Taryn Manning, Olivia Munn, Travis Scott, Cameron Diaz, Dolph Ziggler, Justin Bieber, Hilary Duff, Kirsten Dunst, Nicole Kidman, Drew Barrymore, Charlize Theron, Lindsay Lohan, Miley Cyrus, Holly Madison, David Banks, Jaden Smith, Michael Fassbender, Sam Worthington, Taylor Momsen, Kat Von D, Keith Urban, Amy Poehler, Paul Gascoigne, Marc Overmars, Faustino Asprilla, Juicy J, Kourtney Kardashian, DJ Mustard, Odell Beckham Jr, Ann Sydney, Kylie Jenner, Benicio del Toro, Pilar Rubio, Slaven Bilić, Pablo Zabaleta, Anushka Sharma, Terry Butcher, Ian Wright, Patrick Vieira, Paul Mariner, Stuart Pearce, Iggy Azalea, Bjorn Einar Romoren.

Iron Maiden's distinct logo has adorned all of the band's releases since their debut, 1979's The Soundhouse Tapes EP. The typeface originates with Vic Fair's poster design for the 1976 science fiction film, The Man Who Fell to Earth, also used by Gordon Giltrap, although Steve Harris claims that he designed it himself, using his abilities as an architectural draughtsman. Metal Lord / Iron Maiden, a characteristic font known from the group's classic logo, disseminated around the world by graphic works related to the band's activities, has found its way into pop culture for good, becoming a motif commonly used to create various logos and inscriptions. The band's characteristic graphic motifs have appeared on huge stadium banners many times during football games in many countries around the world. The song "Always Look on the Bright Side of Life" (from Monty Python's Life of Brian) is a staple at their concerts, where the recording is played after the final encore.

At the beginning of January 2021, at general audience in Aula Paolo VI, Pope Francis was honoured with a circus show presented by 25 artists of Ronny Roller Circus, accompanied, among others, by presentation of the classic piece "The Trooper". It was the first time in history when a composition by a heavy metal artist was sounded in the Vatican. BMW in collaboration with Motorrad Bögel GmbH has created a customized model of the IRON R18 motorcycle inspired by Iron Maiden's unique musical and visual style. The German foundation, which aims to help young people with mental health problems, was named "Run to the Hills" after one of Iron Maiden's greatest hits. According to the president of the institution, the slogan "Run to the Hills" is about motivating people to overcome personal difficulties.

Influence on other artists and the genre
Kiss co-founder Paul Stanley noted that Iron Maiden "have helped spawn an entire genre of music" and influenced literally thousands of other artists. According to Guitar World, Iron Maiden's music has "influenced generations of newer metal acts, from legends like Metallica to current stars like Avenged Sevenfold," with Metallica drummer Lars Ulrich commenting that he has "always had an incredible amount of respect and admiration for them." Ulrich has frequently cited Iron Maiden as probably the biggest influence on Metallica's career. Metallica's guitarist Kirk Hammett described the cover of Iron Maiden's debut LP as his favourite album cover and stated that the song "Phantom of the Opera" from that album played an important role in his development as a guitarist. Hammett explained how "(...) a lot of guitar elements from that song can still be heard in his work with Metallica today". Kerry King of Slayer stated that "they meant so much to [him] in their early days". Two of the founding members of Anthrax, guitarist Scott Ian and bassist Danny Lilker, have also cited Iron Maiden as one of the band's main influences and inspirations (especially early on in their career), the former going on to say that "they had a major impact on [his] life." Megadeth have cited Iron Maiden as one of their biggest inspiration on many different levels. Members of Testament have stated that Iron Maiden were one of their blueprint bands and have covered their songs many times. Exodus guitarist Gary Holt and late singer Paul Baloff have also acknowledged Iron Maiden as one of the band's influences, with the former citing both them and Judas Priest as "basically the calibre of the stuff [he] listened to" in Exodus' early years. Kurt Cobain, late founder, composer, vocalist and guitarist of Nirvana, was a big fan of Iron Maiden. Both former and current members of Suicidal Tendencies have also mentioned Iron Maiden as one of the sources of inspiration behind their music. Alice in Chains musicians mentioned about Iron Maiden's influences on them.

Tobias Forge, frontman and leader of Swedish rock band Ghost stated that "for me personally, they have been very influential musically, I've always listened to them a lot growing up as a metal fan. Their live album, Live After Death, had — and still has — a great impact on me when it comes to work ethic. Going through that book that came with the record, watching all those dates. When I was a kid, I would sit there with a map book and pin out all the cities they played on that tour. It was like a hundred shows all over America. The show was so over the top, so it set a standard. "[Iron] Maiden was one of the big movers when it came to '80s heavy metal merchandise. All of our merchandise has always been inspired by bands like Maiden. That's the sort of idea I had about rock and roll merchandise." Ville Valo, the former singer of the Finnish metal band HIM, stated that the Somewhere on Tour 1986 in Helsinki show was the first he attended and the kind of spectacle made an immense impression on him. Iron Maiden's repertoire inspired Valo to write his own music and perform live before his own audience.

M. Shadows of Avenged Sevenfold stated that Iron Maiden "are by far the best live band in the world and their music is timeless", while Trivium singer Matt Heafy comments that "without Iron Maiden, Trivium surely wouldn't exist". Slipknot and Stone Sour frontman Corey Taylor said that "Steve Harris does more with four fingers than I've ever seen anybody do. And Bruce Dickinson? Dude! To me, he was the quintessential old-school heavy metal singer. He could hit notes that were just sick, and he was a great showman. Everything made me a fan. And there wasn't a dude that I hung out with that wasn't trying to draw Eddie on their schoolbooks", while their music also helped Jesper Strömblad of In Flames to pioneer the melodic death metal genre, stating that he had wanted to combine death metal with Iron Maiden's melodic guitar sounds. Viking metallers of Swedish band Amon Amarth stated Iron Maiden is one of their biggest influence also participated in Iron Maiden's Legacy of the Beast RPG game project. Chris Impellitteri stated Iron Maiden have influenced "virtually every heavy metal band in existence with their music, brand, and of course talent!"

Matt Bellamy, frontman of the English rock band Muse, revealed his love and great respect for Steve Harris' band: "(...) Iron Maiden were the British band and also felt a bit more punk rock in ways. The song "Phantom Of The Opera" [from Iron Maiden's self-titled debut album] doesn't feel as bloated or overtly classical as other metal songs. There's still something quite angry and scary about it. That's why Maiden are a band we've always looked up to. That usage of the harmonic minor scale and the progressive approach to arrangements is something that we share, even if we never sounded like them and live in a different genre. We have a lot of respect for them as musicians, especially Steve Harris, who is one of the best bass players around."

Anthrax drummer Charlie Benante stated Iron Maiden "made every band that were influenced by them aspire to be like them. When I was learning to play guitar, this was one of the tunes I practiced. I developed as a guitar player and my coordination got better and better. Maiden had something different, they brought out that Primal roar from us. This was a New style of Hard Rock and Metal, they had a Punk Drive to them with Boston styled Guitar licks, they changed the game. I often said, no Maiden, no Big 4." Rafael Bittencourt, the guitarist of Brazilian heavy metal band Angra, praised Iron Maiden as the band which finally defined power metal style. Brendon Small, an American musician, stand-up comedian, animator, writer, producer and the actor, known for co-creating the animated series Home Movies and Metalocalypse, was inspired by Iron Maiden music and iconography.

Employed to Serve's Sammy Urwin stated: "(...) their influence is absolutely huge, Maiden are a funny one. They're the one that seems to stick out for people, especially in the hardcore scene. Everyone is into Sabbath and Priest, but Maiden can be the Marmite one of the three. But they've influenced so much metalcore. Everyone from Prayer For Cleansing, Unearth and Darkest Hour – the influence of records like The Number Of The Beast on bands like that is undeniable. Not just influential on a musical level, The Number Of The Beast is as much a part of heavy music culture as it is a straightforward, mandatory soundtrack for diehard metalheads. In fact, the album has transcended its heavy metal origins and passed into the broader mainstream."

Famous pop singer Lady Gaga stated she admires what Iron Maiden have achieved in their career and aims to follow in their path. "The devotion of the fans moving in unison, pumping their fists, watching the show, when I see that, I see the paradigm for my future and the relationship I want to have with my fans. Iron Maiden's never had a hit song, and they tour stadiums around the world, and their fans live, breathe and die for Maiden, and that is my dream. That is my dream." Miley Cyrus stated that Steve Harris's band is one of her favorites and the band's music has had a significant impact on shaping her taste in music. Chuck D, founder of the iconic rap group Public Enemy, admits: "The whole idea for the Public Enemy concept album began with our amazement that bands like Iron Maiden were able to include a number of messages and details on the covers of their albums." Joakim Broden, songwriter who is the lead vocalist, keyboardist, and occasional third guitarist of the Swedish heavy metal band Sabaton, stated Iron Maiden's The Number of the Beast "is an album that defines an entire music genre". Band's formula secret is about "taking the energy of punk and put it into heavy metal without losing any of what made metal great."

Johnny Cash, an American country musician, singer and actor, has repeatedly expressed his respect for heavy metal performers, in particular Iron Maiden and Metallica.

Miho Rosana, the former bass player of Japanese metal band Lovebites, described her respect to Iron Maiden and their eponymous debut album in a few sentences: "(...) Iron Maiden's self-titled debut is the greatest album of the last 50 years. It is important because of its unprecedented sound. It saw progressive metal sounds fused with the aggression of punk, and in doing so became the cornerstone of the New Wave Of British Heavy Metal. Truly an iconic album in every way. You can hear Iron Maiden's influence in so much metal that followed and even in new bands today. It wouldn't be an exaggeration to say that without them, today's metal scene would be very different."

Other artists who cite the band as an influence include Chris Jericho, a professional wrestler and lead singer of Fozzy, multi-instrumentalist Twiggy Ramirez (Marilyn Manson, A Perfect Circle, Nine Inch Nails), Myles Kennedy an American musician, singer, and songwriter, best known as the lead vocalist and rhythm guitarist of the rock band Alter Bridge, and as the lead vocalist in guitarist Slash's backing band, guitarist Dave Navarro (Jane's Addiction, Red Hot Chili Peppers, Guns N' Roses, Nine Inch Nails, Alanis Morissette), Serj Tankian, frontman of System of a Down, Zoltan Bathory, the guitarist of Five Finger Death Punch, musicians of an American heavy metal band Lamb of God, David Vincent and Steve Tucker of Morbid Angel, Lee Altus of Exodus and Heathen, musicians of American progressive metal band Mastodon, Tom Morello, the lead guitarist of RATM and Audioslave, Cam Pipes, lead vocalist of 3 Inches of Blood, Joey Vera bassist of Armored Saint, Vitaly Dubinin, bassist of Aria, Michel Langevin, founding member and drummer of Voivod, Mille Petrozza, vocalist and lead guitarist of Kreator, Marcel Schirmer of German thrash metal band Destruction, Chuck Schuldiner, late frontman, founder and guitarist of Death, Paul Allender, guitarist of British extreme metallers Cradle of Filth, Adam Nergal Darski, co-founder, frontman, composer and the lead guitarist of Polish blackened death metal band Behemoth, David Draiman, the vocalist of American band Disturbed, Ihsahn, composer, vocalist and lead guitarist of Emperor, musicians of German power metal band Helloween, American metal band Machine Head, Washington-based band the Melvins, Bay Area thrash metal band Death Angel, American progressive metal band Fates Warning, Canadian rock band Sum 41, American rock band Skid Row, American heavy metal bands Sanctuary and Nevermore, Paul Gilbert, co-founder of Mr. Big band, Jon Schaffer, the rhythm guitarist and principal songwriter of the Florida-based heavy metal band Iced Earth, Mikael Åkerfeldt, guitarist and lead vocalist of Opeth, and X Japan drummer Yoshiki and former guitarist hide. Andreas Kisser and Max Cavalera of Brazilian metal band Sepultura. Welsh heavy metal band Bullet for My Valentine, American rock band My Chemical Romance, musicians of Sentenced, Cristina Scabbia of Lacuna Coil, Ville Valo, the frontman of HIM, also musicians of Amorphis and Therion. Both current and former Dream Theater members John Petrucci, John Myung, and Mike Portnoy have stated that Iron Maiden were one of their biggest influences. Kat Von D a Mexican-American tattoo artist, model, entrepreneur and recording artist was influenced by the band. Franck Hueso better known as Carpenter Brut listed Iron Maiden's second album Killers among ten records which changed his life. Lorenzo Raganzini a techno musician and the performer who uses remixes of metal music including Iron Maiden's classics, described the band as one of his greatest inspirations.

Iron Maiden's musical style has also influenced many Scandinavian extreme metal bands including Nifelheim, Watain, Enslaved, Dissection, Dimmu Borgir, Varg Vikernes of Burzum, Fenriz of Darkthrone just to name a few. Greek metal stage was extremely influenced by the band, not mentioning traditional heavy metal bands, many Hellenic Black Metal artists were inspired by Iron Maiden. Musicians of Rotting Christ, Varathron, Necromantia, or Yoth Iria have been stating about English formation has influenced on them. Polish heavy metal pioneers Turbo many times have mentioned about Iron Maiden being one of their biggest influences to date. The band's second album Smak ciszy (1985) was officially dedicated to Iron Maiden. A few decades later Turbo musicians supported live former Maiden's frontman Paul Di'Anno.

Among the countless musicians and bands which have been introduced into metal or influenced by Iron Maiden are: Gene Hoglan of Dark Angel, Dethklok and ex-Death, Testament, Strapping Young Lad and Fear Factory, the late Dimebag Darrell of Pantera and Damageplan, Vicious Rumors, Anathema, Aaron Stainthorpe of My Dying Bride, Bobby 'Blitz' Ellsworth of Overkill, Karl Sanders of Nile, Gojira, Moonspell, Hammerfall, Kurdt Vanderhoof of Metal Church, Annihilator's Jeff Waters, Jorn Lande, Carcass, Stratovarius, Warlock, Larry LaLonde of Primus and ex-Possessed and Blind Illusion, Queensryche, Michael Amott of Arch Enemy, Funeral for a Friend, Children of Bodom, Running Wild, Grave Digger, Necrophobic, Chris Barnes of Six Feet Under and ex-Cannibal Corpse, George "Corpsegrinder" Fisher of Cannibal Corpse, Wolf, Edguy, Angra, Blind Guardian, Nuclear Assault, Gamma Ray, Iron Savior, Powerwolf, Zeal & Ardor, Marek Pająk, guitarist of Vader, Nocny Kochanek, Scream Maker, CETI, Sepultura, A Wilhelm Scream, Savatage, D.R.I., Escape the Fate, Hellsongs, Candiria, Sodom, Sacred Reich, Coroner, Watchtower, Wrathchild America, Forced Entry, Flotsam and Jetsam (whose song "Iron Maiden" is a tribute to the band) and surreal artist Vincent Castiglia among many others.

Brian Slagel, the owner of Metal Blade Records, stated: "The Number Of The Beast, to me, still to this day, is the perfect heavy metal album. Everything is perfect. The sound is perfect, the songs are perfect, the lyrics are perfect. It's the ultimate heavy metal album and it checks off all the boxes. Forty years on, the influence of The Number Of The Beast can be heard in a vast array of contemporary heaviness, and it might be quicker to list notable metal musicians who don't cite the record as an inspiration. For me it along a time when I was really heavily getting into the whole metal thing. I was starting my record company and it was a pivotal point in my life, and which determined what I would do for the rest of it! Maiden motivated me to do whatever I could to make other people hear this amazing music. It was a life-changing experience."

As noticed music journalist Geoff Barton, the band's music constituted an important passage between the classic heavy rock school of the turn of the 1960s and 1970s, based on rhythm 'n blues, and contemporary heavy metal, characterised by sub-genre diversification and stylistic eclecticism. According to Rock 'n Roll Fantasy Camp the style and attitude of Iron Maiden drummer Nicko McBrain has inspired generations of heavy-metal drummers that followed. As stated the former editor of the German magazine Rock Hard, Götz Kühnemund, Iron Maiden were (and still are) the inspiration for all the heavy metal bands we know today because they're an intrinsically heavy metal group. It is equally important for those who play power metal, speed, thrash, death, black, hard rock – almost every genre. Iron Maiden took hard rock from the '70s, took it into the' 80s, and created a new genre that didn't exist before. This band introduced a DIY approach to all rock music. They even more than all the others popularised guitar harmonies in metal. Many metal bands in existence today have two guitarists, who use double guitar harmonies, and that's where they are inspired by Iron Maiden.

Jörg Pistorius, German music journalist, stated there is: "No single band can claim to have created or invented heavy metal. However, there is one that shaped it and was largely responsible for making it a globally recognized style and market segment with high sales potential. (...) Iron Maiden played fast guitar figures sparkling with energy, combined with harmonious melodies and choruses that could be sung immediately. No band has shaped heavy metal as much as Iron Maiden."

Ian Christe, the Swiss musician, music journalist and an author of publication entitled Sound of the Beast claimed that Iron Maiden are responsible for the further development of the genre, carried out under the aegis of the New Wave of British Heavy Metal. As he claimed, Iron Maiden, together with Judas Priest, is responsible for the greatest development of the metal genre. While AC/DC and Black Sabbath remained primal, dark, it was Iron Maiden and Judas Priest who transformed the twin guitar harmonies, creating a whole new quality.

According to music journalist and the writer Neil Daniels Iron Maiden "redefined the whole genre blending classic heavy rock influence with punky vibe, twin guitars attack and progressive approach which finally have created the new quality. Band's influence on generations of rock and metal bands cannot be overstated. They elevated metal to an art form, proving that academic and musical inspirations can coexist." From the artist's profile published by the Rock and Roll Hall of Fame it appears that "in the 1980s, Iron Maiden released seven high-octane albums that cemented them as one of the greatest rock bands – creating a blueprint for how heavy metal bands should look, sound and tour."

Former guitarist and co-founder of Judas Priest band, K.K. Downing, confessed Iron Maiden's "music does not quite suit my taste, I cannot deny that it has had a great influence on heavy metal and music in general. As a Brit, I am terribly proud of what they have managed over the years to fill the niche they have created. Besides, I have always admired them for being able to achieve such a great commercial success for their marketing activities."

Steve Harris is considered one of the most influential musicians and composers in heavy rock history. He is also the author of the lion's share of the Iron Maiden's repertoire and the creator of the archetypal composition pattern in modern metal. In addition to writing riffs, vocal melodies and lyrics for most songs, he was also involved in audio-visual production and editing. The riffs created by him are among the most unforgettable in history, as evidenced by compositions such as "The Trooper", "The Number of the Beast", "Phantom of the Opera", "Run to the Hills", "Fear of the Dark" or "Hallowed Be Thy Name". The creator of Iron Maiden has been repeatedly named the best and most influential metal bassist of all time. He is also the originator of extremely expressive, galloping bass lines. His compositional style is based on triplets consisting of sixteenths and eighth notes, creating intense rhythmic background for a double (then triple) guitar attack. Steve Harris is one of the few bass players who can play extremely fast and dense with just his fingers. This ability has become a sensation in the context of the entire heavy metal scene. According to the Ultimate Classic Rock editors "technically it was incredibly impressive to achieve so much speed and dynamics in the sound without using a standard pick". The founder of Iron Maiden inspired masses of future musicians, including such thrash metal bassists as Frankie Bello of Anthrax, and former and current Metallica bassists Cliff Burton, Jason Newsted, and Robert Trujillo.

Appearance in media
The first heavy metal videos in history broadcast by MTV were the images for the live versions of "Iron Maiden" and "Wrathchild" taken from official VHS Live at the Rainbow (Iron Maiden). The song "Flash of the Blade" was included on the soundtrack of Dario Argento's 1985 horror film Phenomena (AKA "Creepers") and was covered by the American band Avenged Sevenfold on their double live album/DVD Live in the LBC & Diamonds in the Rough. Rhapsody of Fire have also recorded a cover of the song that is featured on the deluxe edition of their album From Chaos to Eternity. "Flash of the Blade" can also be heard in the Jem and the Holograms episode "Kimber's Rebellion", just after the cartoon band members return home from Paris, on a boom-box stereo being carried by a passerby.

The band's name has been mentioned prominently in several songs, such as the singles "Teenage Dirtbag" by Wheatus, "Back to the 80's" by Danish dance-pop band Aqua. and "Fat Lip" by Sum 41. Iron Maiden have also been referenced in Weezer's "Heart Songs" (from their 2008 self-titled "Red" album), Blues Traveller's "Psycho Joe" (from 1997's Straight on till Morning), and NOFX's "Eddie, Bruce and Paul" (from their 2009 album Coaster), which Sputnikmusic describes as "a humorous retelling of Paul DiAnno's departure".

The number of releases and ventures in tribute to the British formation can be estimated in hundreds, moreover - the reinterpretations of the band's achievements make up an extremely wide range of stylistic variants, such as: numerous sub-genres of rock and metal, soul, pop, classics, symphonic music, alternative music, electro, techno, industrial, hip-hop, rap, reggae, ska, jazz, chorales, pastiches, piano music, early music, string music, early music or acoustic versions with a wide range of classical instruments. In 2008, Kerrang! released Maiden Heaven: A Tribute to Iron Maiden, an album composed of Iron Maiden cover songs performed by Metallica, Machine Head, Dream Theater, Trivium, Coheed and Cambria, Avenged Sevenfold, and other groups influenced by the band. In 2010, Maiden uniteD, an acoustic tribute band consisting of members of Ayreon, Threshold and Within Temptation, released Mind the Acoustic Pieces, a re-interpretation of the entire Piece of Mind album. As of 2021 nearly 200 Iron Maiden cover audio-visual releases exist (each featuring various artists), including piano, electro, string quartet and hip-hop tributes among many others.

Iron Maiden songs have been featured in the soundtracks of several video games, including Carmageddon 2, Grand Theft Auto: Vice City, Grand Theft Auto: Episodes from Liberty City, Grand Theft Auto IV: The Lost and Damned, Marvel's Guardians of the Galaxy, Tony Hawk's Pro Skater 4, SSX on Tour and Madden NFL 10. Their music also appears in the Guitar Hero and Rock Band series of rhythmic video games. The U.S. shooter game entitled PowerSlave was a reference to the Iron Maiden's album of the same name, released In 1984, which also features an Egyptian-themed cover.

Transformers author Bill Forster is an avowed Iron Maiden fan and made several Iron Maiden references, including song lyrics and the phrase "Up the Irons" in his books, including The Ark series and The AllSpark Almanac series. Iron Maiden music, lyrics, themes, fans and iconography have appeared in many episodes and movies including quasi-documentary comedies as Schemers, The Night of the Beast also in documentary movies such as Global Metal or band's own Flight 666 among many others. Iron Maiden songs have also appeared in films, such as Murder by Numbers; while MTV's animated duo Beavis and Butt-Head have commented favourably on the band several times. "The Trooper" song and elements of the band's image appeared in a youth musical comedy entitled Metal Lords broadcast on Netflix. Numerous threads referring to the history of Iron Maiden and the role of the group in shaping the genre were included in individual episodes of the series Stranger Things (the character of Eddie Munson, recordings, presented releases and graphics), while the music of the group was included in the soundtrack of the production of The Terminal List. On 17 November 2022, German television mogul ARD broadcast a series of documentaries entitled How Heavy Metal Saved My Life about the role of music in the lives of fans. One of the episodes was dedicated to Iron Maiden fans.

Bruce Dickinson is the most active in media member of the band. Iron Maiden frontman presented Bruce Dickinson's Friday Rock Show on BBC radio station 6 Music from 2002 to 2010. In addition to his show on 6 Music, Dickinson also hosted a series entitled Masters of Rock on BBC Radio 2 from 2003 to 2007. His singing and episode acting were presented in The Club Paradise, Mr. Bean's Elected, and A Nightmare on Elm Street: The Dream Child Dickinson's aviation passion and storytelling talent were reflected in Flying Heavy Metal (Discovery Series) among many other documents. Bruce Dickinson was the main character of the Psycho Schizo Espresso podcast, which was published on social platforms. The topics of individual episodes were phenomena that could not be explained in a rational way. The interviews with controversial people were also broadcast. In 2023 Netflix aired animated series entitled BASTARD!! - Heavy Metal, Dark Fantasy, which takes place in different worlds of heavy metal music. One of them is called "Maiden World" referring to the British formation.

Claims of Satanic references
In 1982, the band released one of their most popular, controversial and acclaimed albums, The Number of the Beast. The artwork and title track led to Christian groups in the United States branding the band as Satanists, encouraging people to destroy copies of the release. The band's manager, Rod Smallwood, later commented that Christians initially burnt the records, but later decided to destroy them with hammers through fear of breathing in the melting vinyl's fumes. The protests were not restricted to the US, with Christian organisations preventing Iron Maiden from performing in Chile in 1992.

Contrary to the accusations, the band have always denied the notion that they are Satanists, with lead vocalist, Bruce Dickinson, doing so on-stage in the Live After Death concert video. Steve Harris has since commented that, "It was mad. They completely got the wrong end of the stick. They obviously hadn't read the lyrics. They just wanted to believe all that rubbish about us being Satanists." Harris has also stated that "The Number of the Beast" song was inspired by a nightmare he had after watching Damien: Omen II, and also influenced by Robert Burns' "Tam o' Shanter". Furthermore, the band's drummer, Nicko McBrain, has been a born-again Christian since 1999.

Ed Force One

For their Somewhere Back in Time World Tour in 2008 and 2009, Iron Maiden commissioned an Astraeus Airlines Boeing 757 as transport. The aeroplane was converted into a combi configuration, which enabled it to carry the band, their crew and stage production, thereby allowing the group to perform in countries which were previously deemed unreachable logistically. It was also repainted with a special Iron Maiden livery, which the airline decided to retain after receiving positive feedback from customers.

The aircraft, named "Ed Force One" after a competition on the band's website, was flown by Dickinson, as he was also a commercial airline pilot for Astraeus, and plays a major role in the award-winning documentary Iron Maiden: Flight 666, which was released in cinemas in 42 countries in April 2009. A different aeroplane (registered G-STRX) was used for The Final Frontier World Tour in 2011 with altered livery, adopting the artwork of The Final Frontier album, and features heavily in the 2012 documentary "Behind the Beast".

For The Book of Souls World Tour in 2016, the band upgraded to an ex-Air France Boeing 747-400 jumbo jet, supplied by Air Atlanta Icelandic (registered TF-AAK) and customised by Volga-Dnepr Gulf, which allows for more space without the aircraft having to undergo a significant conversion to carry their equipment. In January 2022, Bruce Dickinson told the Associated Press that he would not be piloting band's plane on their upcoming tour citing his nearing the mandatory age limit for commercial airline pilots. According to the Federal Aviation Administration (FAA) and the International Civil Aviation Organization (ICAO), commercial pilots must retire at age 65. However, there is currently no maximum age limit for being a private pilot or for being an Air Force pilot.

Musical style and influences

Steve Harris, Iron Maiden's bassist and primary songwriter, has stated that his influences include Black Sabbath, Deep Purple, Led Zeppelin, Uriah Heep, Pink Floyd, Genesis, Yes, Jethro Tull, Thin Lizzy, UFO, Queen and Wishbone Ash. In 2010 Harris stated, "I think if anyone wants to understand Maiden's early thing, in particular the harmony guitars, all they have to do is listen to Wishbone Ash's Argus album. Thin Lizzy too, but not as much. And then we wanted to have a bit of a prog thing thrown in as well, because I was really into bands like Genesis and Jethro Tull. So you combine all that with the heavy riffs and the speed, and you've got it." In 2004, Harris explained that the band's "heaviness" was inspired by "Black Sabbath and Deep Purple with a bit of Zeppelin thrown in." On top of this, Harris developed his own playing style, which guitarist Janick Gers describes as "more like a rhythm guitar," cited as responsible for the band's galloping style, heard in such songs as "The Trooper" and "Run to the Hills."

The band's guitarists, Dave Murray, Adrian Smith, and Janick Gers, each have their own individual influences and playing style. Dave Murray is known for his legato technique which, he claims, "evolved naturally. I'd heard Jimi Hendrix using legato when I was growing up, and I liked that style of playing." Stating that he "was inspired by blues rock rather than metal," Adrian Smith was influenced by Johnny Winter and Pat Travers, leading to him becoming a "melodic player." Janick Gers, on the other hand, prefers a more improvised style, largely inspired by Ritchie Blackmore, which he claims is in contrast to Smith's "rhythmic" sound.

Singer Bruce Dickinson, who typically works in collaboration with guitarist Adrian Smith, has an operatic vocal style, inspired by Arthur Brown, Peter Hammill, Ian Anderson and Ian Gillan, and is often considered to be one of the best heavy metal vocalists of all time. Although Nicko McBrain has only received one writing credit, on the Dance of Death album, Harris often relies on him while developing songs. Adrian Smith commented, "Steve loves playing with him. [They] used to work for hours going over these bass and drum patterns."

Throughout their career, the band's style has remained largely unchanged, in spite of the addition of guitar synthesisers on 1986's Somewhere in Time, keyboards on 1988's Seventh Son of a Seventh Son, and an attempt to return to the "stripped down" production of their earlier material on  No Prayer for the Dying. In recent years, however, the band have begun using more progressive elements in their songs, which Steve Harris describes as not progressive "in the modern sense, but like Dream Theater, more in a 70s way". According to Harris, Seventh Son of a Seventh Son was the band's first album which was "more progressive", while they would only return to this style from 1995's The X Factor, which he states is "like an extension of Seventh Son..., in the sense of the progressive element to it". The development contrasts with the band's raw-sounding earlier material, which AllMusic states was "clearly drawing from elements of punk rock", although Harris firmly denies this.

Band members

 Steve Harris – bass, backing vocals (1975–present), keyboards (1988, 1998–present)
 Dave Murray – guitars (1976–1977, 1978–present)
 Adrian Smith – guitars, backing vocals (1980–1990, 1999–present), keyboards (1988)
 Bruce Dickinson – lead vocals (1981–1993, 1999–present), piano (2015)
 Nicko McBrain – drums (1982–present)
 Janick Gers – guitars (1990–present)

Touring musicians
 Michael Kenney – keyboards (1988–2022)

Discography

 Iron Maiden (1980)
 Killers (1981)
 The Number of the Beast (1982)
 Piece of Mind (1983)
 Powerslave (1984)
 Somewhere in Time (1986)
 Seventh Son of a Seventh Son (1988)
 No Prayer for the Dying (1990)
 Fear of the Dark (1992)

 The X Factor (1995)
 Virtual XI (1998)
 Brave New World (2000)
 Dance of Death (2003)
 A Matter of Life and Death (2006)
 The Final Frontier (2010)
 The Book of Souls (2015)
 Senjutsu (2021)

Concert tours

Awards and nominations

See also
 List of artists who reached number one on the UK Singles Chart
 List of new wave of British heavy metal bands
 List of music artists and bands from England
 List of songs recorded by Iron Maiden
 List of Iron Maiden tribute albums
 The Iron Maidens

Citations

References

 
  
 
 
 
 
 
 
 
 
 
 
 
 
 
 
 
 
 
 
 
 
 
 
 
 
 
 
 
 
 
 

 
 
 
 
 
 
 
 
 
 
 
 
 
 
 
 
 
 
 
 
 

 
 
 
 
 
 
 
 
 
 
 
 
 
 
 
 
 
 
 
 
 
 
 
 
  
 

 
 
 
 
 
 
 
 
 
 
 
 
 
 
 
 
 
 
 
 
 
 
  
 
 
 
 
 
 
 
 
 
 
 
 
 
 
 
 
 
 
 
 
 
 
 
 
 
 
 
 
 
 
 
 
 
 
 
 
 
 
 
 
 
 
 
 
 
 
 
 
 
 
 
 
 
 
 
 
 
 
 
 
 
 
 
 
 
 
 
 
 
 
 
 
 
 
 
 
 
 
 
 
 
 
 
 
 
 
 
 
 
 
 
 
 
 
 
 
 
 
 
 
 
 
 
 
 
 
 
 
 
 
 
 
 
 
 
 
 
 
 
 
 
 
 
 
 
 
 
 
 
 
 
 
 
 
 
 
 
 
 
 
 
 
 
 
 
 
 
 
 
 
 
 
 
 
 
 
 
 
 
 
 
 
 
 
 
 
 
 
 
 
 
 
 
 
 
 
 
 
 
 
 
 
 
 
 
 
 
 
 
 
 
 
 
 
 
 
 
 
 
 
 
 
 
 
 
 
 
 
 
 
 
 
 
 
 
 
 
 
 
 
 
 
 
 
 
 
 
 
 
 
 
 
 
 
 
 
 
 
 
 
 
 
 
 
 
 
 
 
 
 
 
 
 
 
 
 
 
 
 
 
 
 
 
 
 
 
 
 
 
 
 
 
 
 
 
 
 
 
 
 
 
 
 
 
 
 
 
 
 
 
 
 
 
 
 
 
 
 
 
 
 
 
 
 
 
 
 
 
 
 
 
 
 
 
 
 
 
 
 
 
 
 
 
 
 
 
 
 
 
 
 
 
 
 
 
 
 
 
 
 
 
 
 
 
 
 
  ASIN B0006B29Z2
 
 
 
 
 
  
 
 
 
 
 
 
 
 
 
 
 
 
 
 
 
 
   
 
 
 
 
 
 
 
 
 
 
 
 
 
 
 
 
 
 
 
 
 
 
 
 
 
 
 
 
 
 
 
 
 
 
 
 
 
 
 
 
 
 
 
 
 
 
 
 
 
 
 
 
 
 
 
 
 
 
 
 
 
 
 
 
 
 
 
 
 
 
 
 
 
 Popoff, Martin (2013). 2 Minutes to Midnight: An Iron Maiden Day-by-Day. Backbeat Books, .

Bibliography

External links

 
 

 
1975 establishments in England
Brit Award winners
Capitol Records artists
EMI Records artists
English heavy metal musical groups
Epic Records artists
Grammy Award winners
Harvest Records artists
Ivor Novello Award winners
Kerrang! Awards winners
Musical groups established in 1975
Musical groups from London
New Wave of British Heavy Metal musical groups
Second British Invasion artists
Parlophone artists
Universal Music Group artists
Warner Music Sweden artists